= Vehicle registration plates of Bulgaria =

Republic of Bulgaria
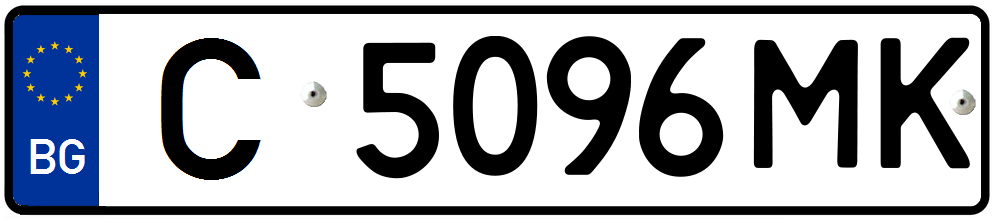
- Current series (privately owned vehicle)
- Country: Bulgaria
- Country code: BG

Current series
- Size: 520 mm × 110 mm 20.5 in × 4.3 in
- Serial format: A(B) 1234 BC {A or AB being the regional code}
- Colour (front): Black on white
- Colour (rear): Black on white

Standard Bulgarian vehicle registration plates display black glyphs (alphanumeric characters) on a white background, together with – on the left-hand side of the plate – a blue vertical "EU strip" showing the flag of Europe (or, for older-registered cars, the flag of Bulgaria) and, below it, the country code for Bulgaria: BG.

The characters displayed in the main field of the plate are:

- a one- or two-letter province code
- four numerals
- a final two-letter code, known as the "series".

The format is thus XX NNNN YY, where XX (or X) is the province code, NNNN is the serial number, and YY is the series. Since 1992, only glyphs that are common to both the Cyrillic and the Latin alphabets have been used on Bulgarian plates.

== Format ==
=== Letters ===
Only 12 letters are used. In Bulgarian order, these are: А, В, Е, К, М, Н, О, Р, С, Т, У, Х. One of these letters, i.e., У (which is the Bulgarian letter for the sound u) does not coincide fully with the Latin capital letter Y. However, for the purpose of registration it is accepted as being the same (the Bulgarian letter У does not originate directly from the Greek or Latin Y). All of these are used as part of the province codes (i.e., on the left). Only nine letters are used in the series (i.e., on the right), of which "А" is the only vowel. The three that are not used in the series, (all vowels) are Е, reserved exclusively for trailers and caravans (e.g., СА 1234 ЕЕ), О and У. Since 2022, the letter E is used in the series of cars in Sofia, (e.g., CB 1234 TE). In 2024, the letter E started being used as a regular last letter in the series. In Sofia, the AE series was introduced after CB 9999 XT (e.g., CB 1234 AE). This was done to prolong the use of the "CB" series for Sofia City. Plovdiv and Varna are also using the new "E" series (e.g., PB 1234 AE in Plovdiv & B 1234 TE in Varna) to prolong the use of their prefix. Lovech and Pleven also began using the new "E" series (e.g., OB 1234 BE in Lovech and EH 1234 ME) despite still having enough unused combinations from other lettered series. On November 15 it was announced that Sofia will introduce the letter O in the series, with the first series of that type being AO.

=== Numbers ===
Number plates with a single letter in the series, i.e. "X(X) NNNN Y", appear mainly on mopeds and motorcycles, but can rarely be seen on some older vehicles that have failed to undergo the obligatory re-registration. The format "X(X) AAAAAA" may be used in vanity plates, where "A" represents either letters or numbers chosen by the owner (a name for example). The price of such a custom plate is BGN 7,000 (approx. €3,500), so these are rare, but popular among the wealthy community in Sofia.

=== Other ===
Not counting the "Е" series, which is reserved for trailers, nor the vanity plates with no series letters, there is a total of 810,000 possible combinations for each province. This total ran out in Sofia ("С") in late 2005, and was replaced by "СА" in early 2006; In 2014, "CB" began to be used.

Note that the number "0" is written normally, while the letter "O" is egg-shaped.

== History ==
=== Until 1958 ===
A pre-1958 registration plate from Sofia

Black letters on a white background, in the format: X(x) NN-NN.

=== 1958–1986 ===
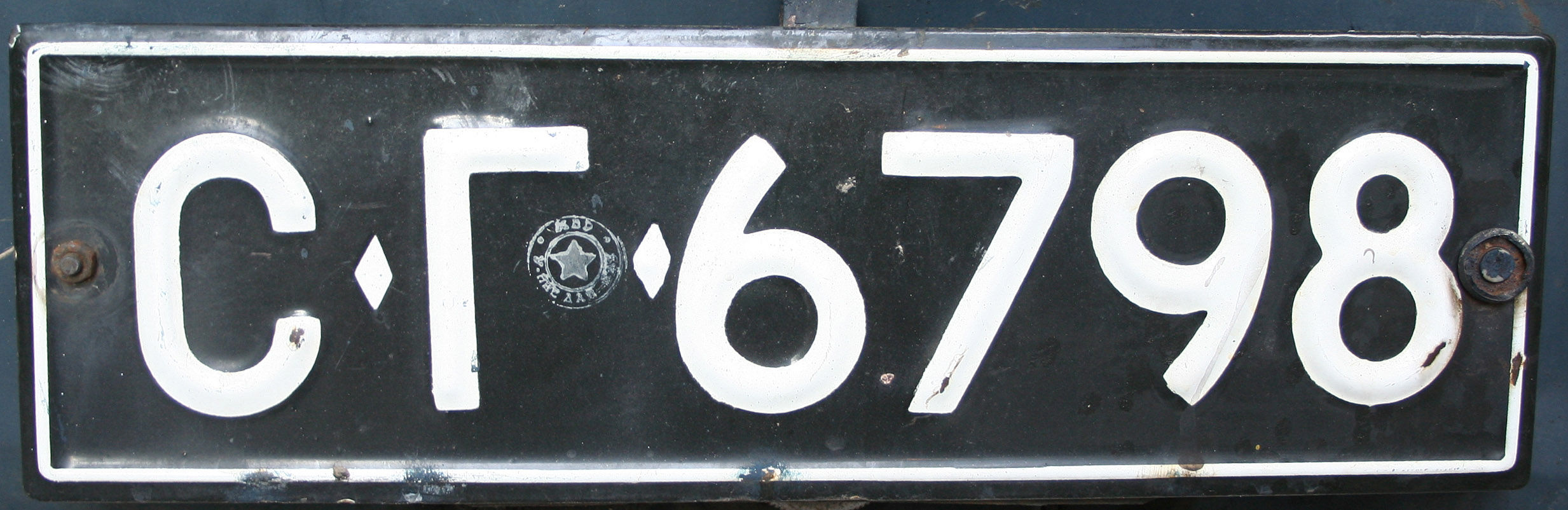

State vehicles retained the black on white format, while private vehicles were given black plates with white lettering. The format was X(x)- NNNN. after reaching 9999 a letter was set in front of the 4 numbers X(x)-Y-NNNN. In the early 80's, after all the combinations with the letter "C" were exhausted in Sofia, a new format was introduced in the capital beginning with "A", namely AYY-NNNN. Plates with the combinations AAB-NNNN and ABC-NNNN were issued before the standard was changed once again in 1986.

=== 1986–1992 ===
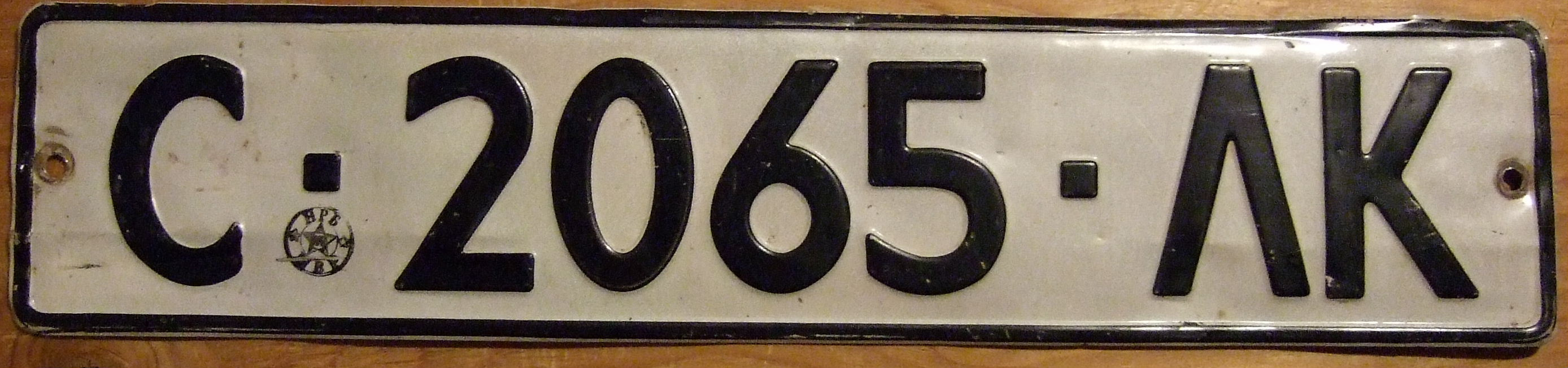

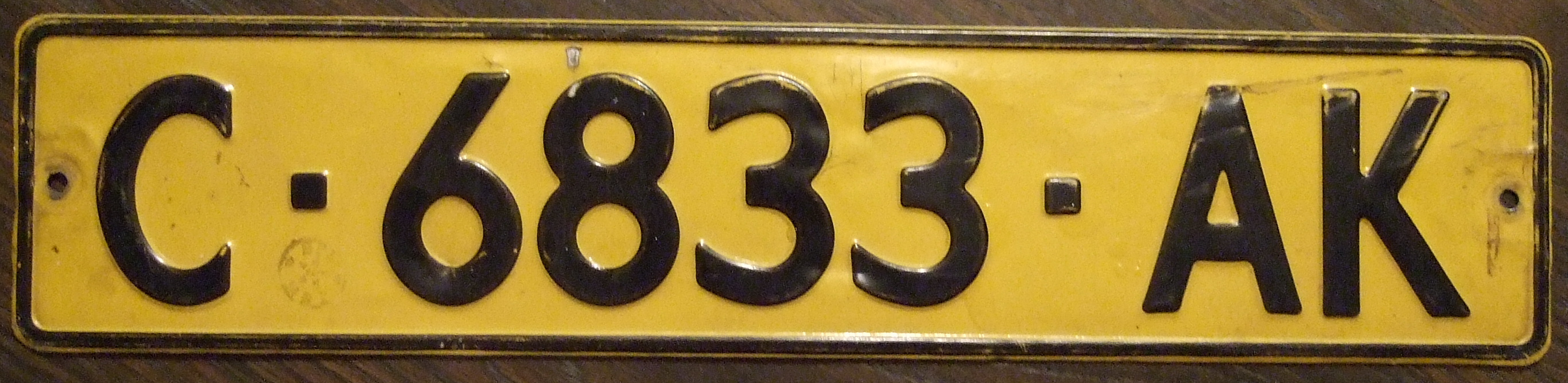

A new issue of plates is introduced with the standard format of "X(X) NNNN Y(Y)". Yellow for private plates, white for state-owned vehicles, with previous-style plates no longer valid. These new plates used ISO 7591 standard font & size and had reflective surfaces. "E" was designated as the series letter for trailers, and "Ч" for private freight and private mass transport vehicles (Ч: частен, private)

=== 1992–present ===
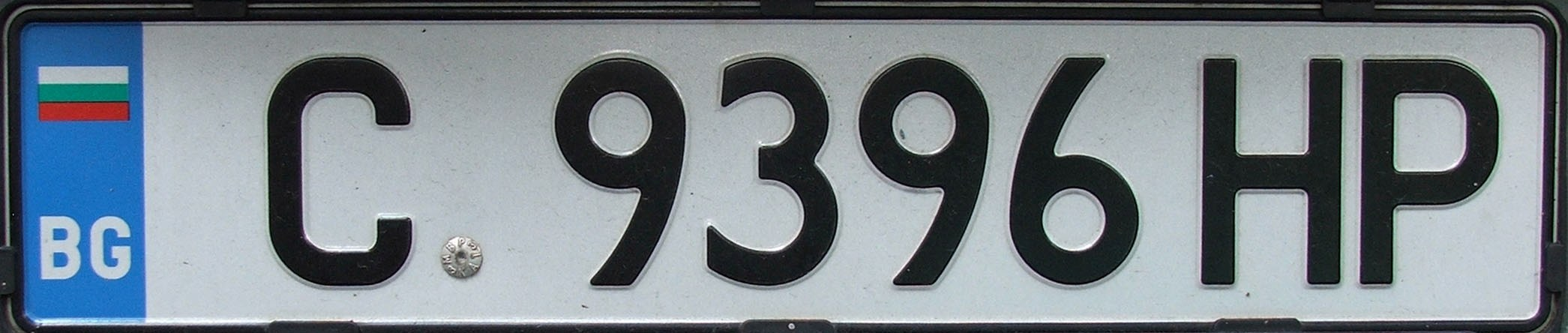

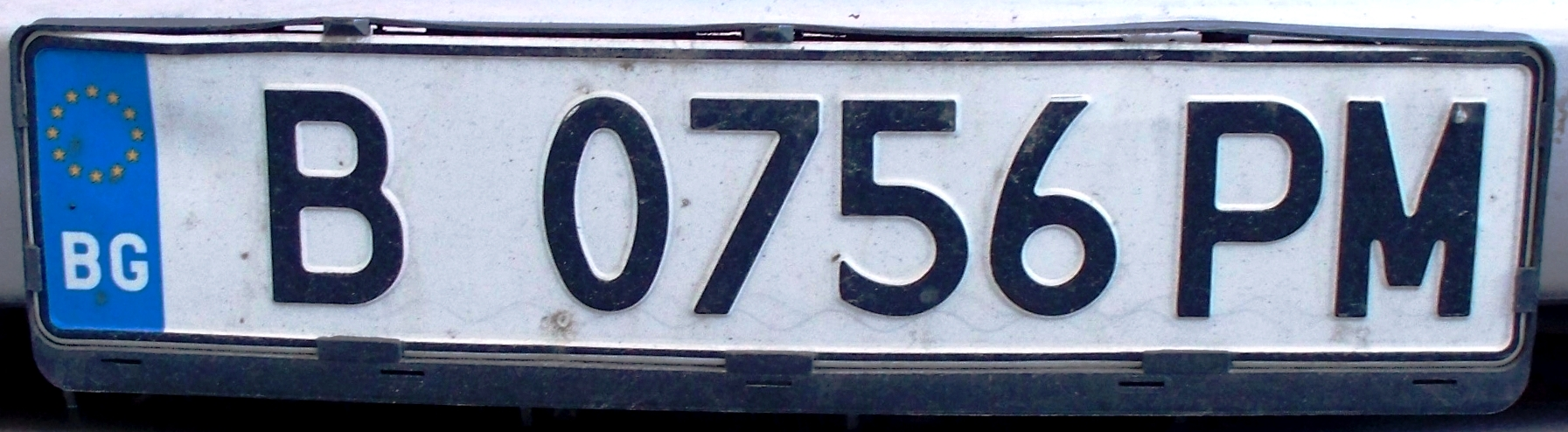

Since 1992, the letter license plate code used letters common to both the Latin and Cyrillic alphabets, irrespective of whether they have the same phonetic value or not: А, В, Е, К, М, Н, О, Р, С, Т, У, Х, the same as today; a similar system is used in Greece, Russia, Belarus, Bosnia and Herzegovina, and Ukraine. Regions are as per ISO 3166-2:BG. The new 1992 issue of plates used a white background, in the format "X(X) NNNN Y". All former yellow background plates became invalid. In 1993, he hyphens between letter and number blocks were also phased out and the plates with those features also became invalid in 1993. During the mid-1990s, the "X NNNN Y" combinations began to run out in many provinces (as there were only 90,000 possible combinations), and so a second letter was added to the series. Between 2000 and 2008, the left-hand blue band Bulgaria flag was phased in, eventually becoming a legal requirement on 1 July 2006. These plates were all in the "X(X) NNNN YY" format, but the shape of the letters was changed to the current standard – namely, the letters were made more "square" and heavier-set than previously. These plates all began with the series "AA", thereby repeating some combinations that had already existed before, albeit without the blue strip.

On 1 January 2007 Bulgaria and Romania joined the European Union. Thus, standardized EU-style plates (with a blue band displaying a country code and an EU flag instead of a national flag) were introduced soon after in lieu of the previous format, which was generally discontinued (although still valid and used on military plates).

== Special types ==
=== Temporary registration of vehicles ===
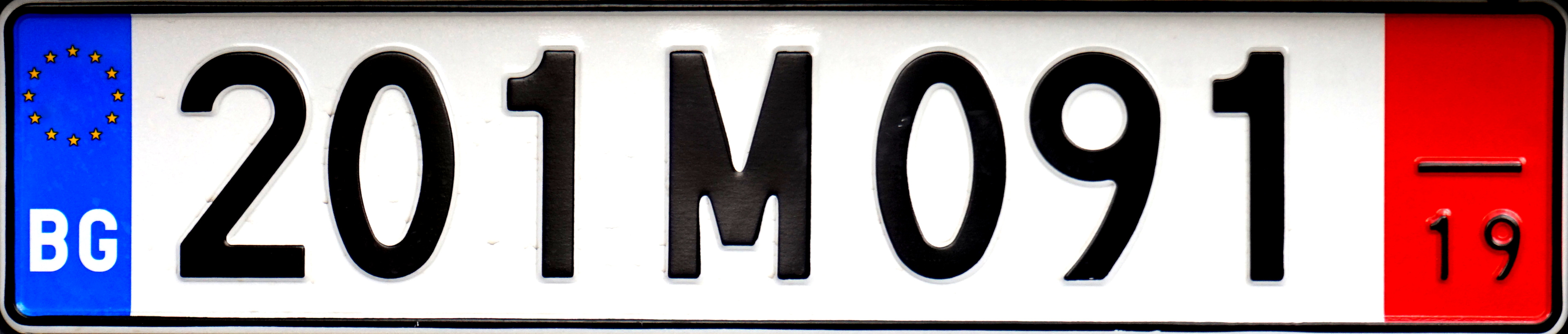

In use are also three other types of plates in format of nnn X nnn:

- Н plate for unregistered vehicles and export (Н: ew)
- М plate, same as H, started 2017 after the Н series was exhausted
- В plate for car dealers (В: временен, temporary)

These three types use a white background with black text and a red vertical strip on the right side. The year of expiration is inscribed on the bottom half of the red strip, and the month of expiration is sometimes placed on the top half, either as a sticker or written with marker.

=== Military and civil protection vehicles ===
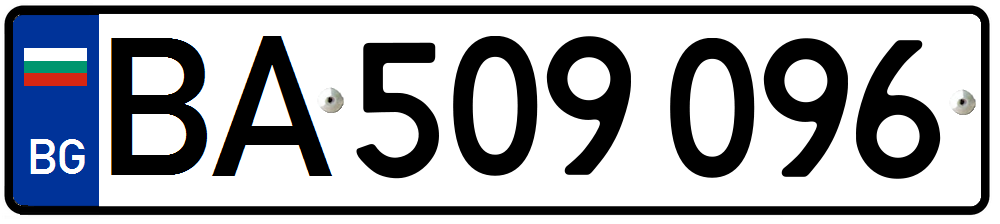
Bulgarian Army plate

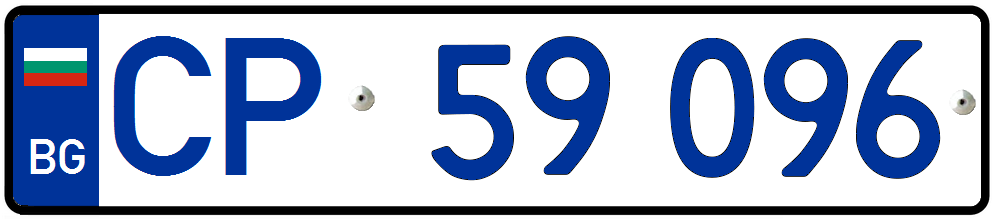
Civil Protection plate

Since 2006, all military vehicles' plates are subject to change with the new ones: the letters "BA" (for Bulgarian Army, formerly "В" in red on a white plate) and 6 digits — the form is "BA NNN NNN". The same form is adopted for the new license plates of the Civil Protection Service of Bulgaria, beginning with "CP" (for Civil Protection, formerly "ГЗ") followed by 5 digits — "CP NN NNN". On the left side of both kinds of plates there is a blue EU-standard vertical strip. The "CP" plates are no longer used.

=== Foreigner vehicles ===
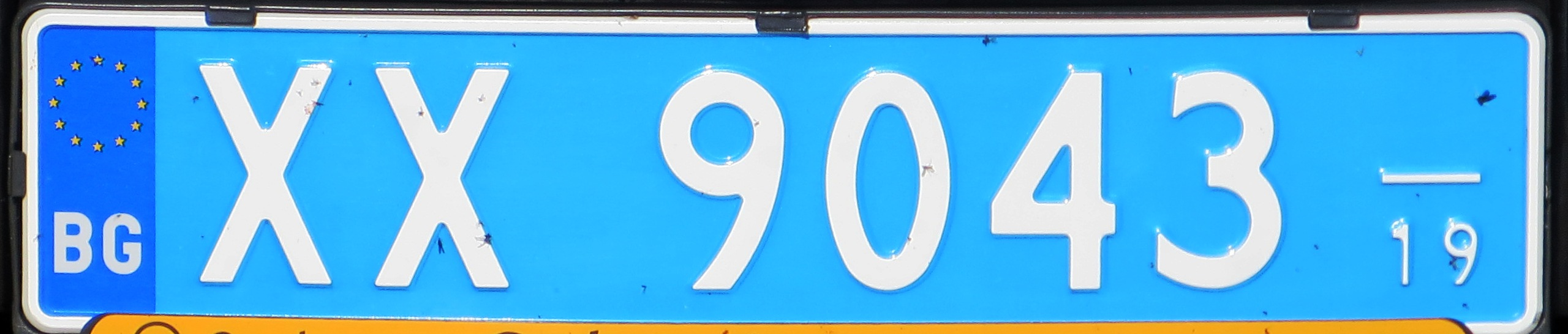
A temporary licence plate of a car registered to a foreigner

Cars belonging to foreigners and imported into Bulgaria for a limited period of time are light blue with white characters, starting with "ХХ", followed by four digits and two small digits denoting the expiry year. From 2019 "XH" is used after "XX".

=== Diplomatic plates ===
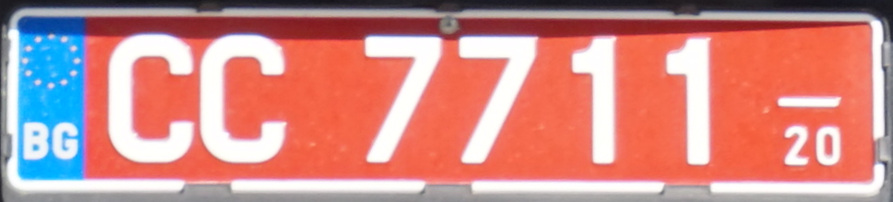
A diplomatic licence plate (Malta consulate)

Diplomatic and consular car number plates are similar to ordinary ones, but are recognizably different in their color: white symbols on a red background. Plates starting with "C" indicate diplomatic status, "CC" indicate consular status, while "CT" is used for cars belonging to other staff of diplomatic representations. Additionally, the first two digits of the numeric group represent the country of the diplomatic or consular mission to which the vehicle belongs. Two smaller digits in the lower right corner denote the expiry year of the plate.

=== Electric vehicles ===
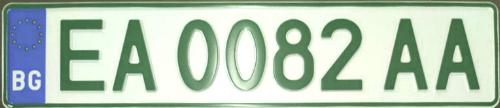
Electrically powered car licence plate

Starting from 17 November 2022 electric vehicles receive plates with dark green font color and beginning with "EA" (electric automobile) instead of the usual province code for cars and "EM" (electric motorcycle) for motorcycles.

=== Repeater plates ===
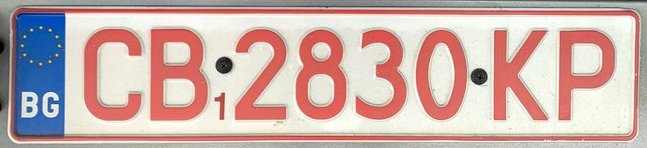
Repeater plate

Repeater plates to be affixed to bicycle racks have red lettering on a white background. They were introduced in June 2015. Several repeating plates can be issued in Bulgaria for the same vehicle.

== Provincial codes ==
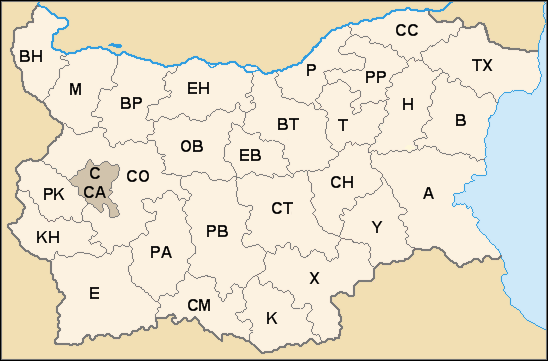
Map of the registration codes

After the requirement that all number plate codes had to be compatible with both the Cyrillic and Latin alphabets came into force:

- The provinces that already had compatible codes retained them: e.g. Varna "B", Ruse "P", Dobrich "TX".
- Each main city's province has its own area code, except the capital, Sofia, which has a code for the capital area, i.e. Sofia and the directly surrounding towns and villages (C, CA, CB), and one for Sofia Province, i.e. the further country, towns, and villages surrounding the capital (CO)
- Most other major cities took on the remaining single-letter codes that were unused: e.g. Burgas "A", Blagoevgrad "E" (a significant exception to this is Plovdiv's "PB")
- The rest adopted two-letter codes that simply included random letters from their names, mostly from Cyrillic, some from Latin, and a few from a combination of the two.

Since 2019, due to change of regulation, it is not compulsory to change registration plate when buying an already registered vehicle, regardless of the region of registration. Therefore, provincial codes show only the region of first registration of the vehicle in Bulgaria.

Current code	Province	Old code	Bulgarian spellings, notes
А	Burgas Province	Бс, Б	БургАс
В	Varna Province	Вн, В	Варна
ВН	Vidin Province	Вд, ВД	ВидиН
ВР	Vratsa Province	Вр, ВР	ВРаца
ВТ	Veliko Tarnovo Province	ВТ	Велико Търново
Е	Blagoevgrad Province	Бл, БЛ	БлагоЕвград
ЕВ	Gabrovo Province	Гб, Г	Габрово
ЕН	Pleven Province	Пл, ПЛ	ПлевЕН
К	Kardzhali Province	Кж, К	Кърджали
КН	Kyustendil Province	Кн, КН	КюстеНдил
М	Montana Province	Мх, М	Монтана
Н	Shumen Province	Ш	ШумеН (SHumen)
ОВ	Lovech Province	Лч, Л	ЛОВеч
Р	Ruse Province	Рс, Р	Русе
РА	Pazardzhik Province	Пз, ПЗ	Пазарджик (PAzardzhik)
РВ	Plovdiv Province	Пд, П	ПловдиВ (Plovdiv)
РК	Pernik Province	Пк, ПК	ПеРниК (PerniK)
РР	Razgrad Province	РЗ	РазгРад
С, СА, СВ	Sofia (Capital)	Сф, С, А	София
СН	Sliven Province	Сл, СЛ	СливеН
СМ	Smolyan Province	См, СМ	СМолян
СО	Sofia Province	СФ	София Област
СС	Silistra Province	Сс, СС	СилиСтра
СТ	Stara Zagora Province	СтЗ, СЗ	СТара Загора
Т	Targovishte Province	Тщ, Т	Търговище
ТХ	Dobrich Province	Тх, ТХ	Добрич ^{(Old name Tolbuhin – ТолбуХин)}
У	Yambol Province	Яб, Я	Ямбол (Yambol)
Х	Haskovo Province	Хс, Х	Хасково

== Diplomatic plate codes ==
Code	Country	Code	Country	Code	Country	Code	Country
01	United Kingdom	26	Venezuela	51	Albania	76	Serbia
02	United States	27	Ghana	52	Vietnam	77	Order of Malta
03	United States	28	Egypt	53	Vietnam	78	Kazakhstan
04	Germany	29	Ecuador	54	N/A	79	South Africa
05	Turkey	30	Ethiopia	55	N/A	80	Vatican City
06	N/A	31	India	56	Cambodia	81	European Commission
07	Greece	32	Indonesia	57	China	82	Slovenia
08	France	33	Iraq	58	China	83	World Bank
09	France	34	Iran	59	North Korea	84	Croatia
10	Italy	35	Yemen	60	Cuba	85	EBRD
11	Belgium	36	Colombia	61	Cuba	86	North Macedonia
12	Denmark	37	Kuwait	62	Mongolia	87	Cyprus
13	Netherlands	38	Libya	63	Nicaragua	88	Norway
14	Spain	39	Lebanon	64	Poland	89	Ukraine
15	Portugal	40	Morocco	65	Poland	90	Moldova
16	Sweden	41	Mexico	66	Romania	91	Armenia
17	Switzerland	42	Peru	67	Qatar	92	Belarus
18	Austria	43	Syria	68	Russia	93	N/A
19	Argentina	44	Uruguay	69	Russia	94	N/A
20	Japan	45	Ireland	70	Azerbaijan	95	Sudan
21	Finland	46	Palestine	71	Bosnia and Herzegovina	96	N/A
22	Israel	47	UNDP	72	Hungary	97	N/A
23	Afghanistan	48	UNHCR	73	Hungary	98	Georgia
24	Algeria	49	IMF	74	Czech Republic	99	Estonia
25	Brazil	50	South Korea	75	Slovakia	00	N/A

== See also ==
- Driving licence in Bulgaria
- Bulgarian identity card
- Bulgarian passport
