= Bulgarians in Lebanon =

Total population
- 400–1,000

Regions with significant populations
- Beirut (Greater Beirut), Sidon

Languages
- Bulgarian, Arabic (Lebanese Arabic)

Religion
- Bulgarian Orthodox Church

Related ethnic groups
- Other Bulgarians

Bulgarians in Lebanon are between 400–1,000 people.

== Culture ==
Associations

Bulgarian associations are: Association of Nurses in Lebanon (2003) and the Association of Lebanese Civilian Graduates in Bulgaria.

Schools

- Bulgarian Saturday school in Lebanon – Beirut (from 2011)

Folk groups

- Group for Bulgarian folklore Българска китка ("Bulgarian bouquet").

== Notable people ==
- Lia Saad, Miss Lebanon Emigrant 2014
- Samir Ayass, footballer
- Eyad Hammoud, footballer

== See also ==
- Bulgaria–Lebanon relations
- Arabs in Bulgaria
- Bulgarian diaspora
- Ethnic groups in Lebanon
