= Serbs in Bulgaria =

Сърби в България Срби у Бугарској Srbi u Bugarskoj

Total population
- 1,497 Serbian citizens (2023) 313 of Serb ancestry (2011)

Languages
- Serbian and Bulgarian

Religion
- Eastern Orthodoxy

Serbs in Bulgaria are Bulgarian citizens of ethnic Serb descent and/or Serbia-born persons living in Bulgaria. According to 2023 data, there were 1,497 Serbian citizens in Bulgaria, while the 2011 figures recorded 313 individuals of Serb ethnic descent.

== History ==
The first modern census, conducted in 1880, which registered native languages used, showed there were 1,894 native speakers of Serbian with the following districts having a significant number:

- Vidin District: 1,260 or 1.2% of the total population
  - Kula Subdistrict: 1,083 or 3.5% of the total population
    - Brakevtsi, Brakevtsi municipality: 1,067 (only Serb majority-settlement in Bulgaria, settled by Serbs in late Ottoman times, after the local Bulgarian population had emigrated to Bessarabia; Brakevtsi was ceded to Serbia in 1919)
  - Vidin Subdistrict: 165 or 0.4% of the total population
- Sofia District: 258 or 0.2% of the total population
  - Sofia Subdistrict: 243 or 0.5% of the total population

== Demographics ==
According to data from the 2011 census, there were 569 Serbian citizens living in Bulgaria, most of whom were expatriates. According to the 2011 census data reported by Bulgaria's National Council for Interethnic Cooperation and Integration, there were country 313 local Serbs, the majority of whom were descendants of old political emigrants.

== Organizations ==
In 2010, an Association of the Serbs in Bulgaria was established.

== Notable people ==
- Ana-Neda – Empress consort of Bulgaria
- Dragana – Empress consort of Bulgaria
- Đoko Rosić – actor
- Miroslav Stefanović-Majstor Miro – chef

== See also ==
- Immigration to Bulgaria
- Serb diaspora
- Bulgaria–Serbia relations
