= Unique citizenship number =

Numbers assigned to each Bulgarian citizen

The unified civil number (Bulgarian: Единен граждански номер, ЕГН, romanized: Edinen grazhdanski nomer, EGN) is a 10-digit unique number assigned to each Bulgarian citizen. It serves as a national identification number. An EGN is assigned to Bulgarians at birth, or when a birth certificate is issued. The uniform system for civil registration and administrative service of population (Bulgarian: Единна система за гражданска регистрация и административно обслужване на населението; abbreviated: ЕСГРАОН, ESGRAON) regulates the EGN system.

== Structure ==
The initial six digits correspond to the birth date. The first two digits are the last two digits of the year, and the last two digits are the day of the month. For people born between 1900 and 1999 the middle digits are the month number: YYMMDD. For people born before 1900, 20 is added to the month: YY M+20 DD. For people born from 2000, 40 is added to the month: YY M+40 DD.

The next three digits designate the birth order number, the third digit being even for males and odd for females. Each district is assigned a range of three-digit numbers, used consecutively, altering even and odd numbers between males and females born on the particular day. In rare cases a district may not have enough numbers, so numbers are "borrowed" from an adjacent district.

A check digit, calculated from the nine digits using the following algorithm, is appended:
1 Each digit is multiplied by its weight; the weight for the nth digit is 2^{n} modulo 11:

Position	1	2	3	4	5	6	7	8	9
Weight	x2	x4	x8	x5	x10	x9	x7	x3	x6

2 The products obtained are added
3 The resulting sum modulo 11 is the check digit. If the result is 10, the check digit becomes 0

== Examples ==
=== Calculation ===
Example 1 : The first female registered born on 5 January 1979 in a district aving the number range 0-50 has :

- 79 (1979) ;
- 01 (January ) ;
- 05 (5th) ;
- 001 (district range is 0-50, and this is first female (odd number) of this date).

So she has 790105001 & the check digit.
For the check digit, each digit is multiplied by its weight : (7×2) + (9×4) + (0×8) + (1×5) + (0×10) + (5×9) + (0×7) + (0×3) + (1×6) = 140 ; divide by 11, (the quotient is 12, ignore it), the remainder is 8 (that is the check digit).
The full EGN is 7901050018.

Example 2 : The 5th male registered born on 11 July 2015 in a district aving the number range 150-300 has :

- 15 (2015) ;
- 47 (July + 40 because he is born after 2000) ;
- 12 (12th) ;
- 158 (district range is 150-300, and this is fifth male (even number) of this date).

So he has 154712158 as base number.
For the check digit, each digit is multiplied by its weight : (1×2) + (5×4) + (4×8) + (7×5) + (1×10) + (2×9) + (1×7) + (5×3) + (8×6) = 187 ; divide by 11, (the quotient is 17, ignore it), the remainder is 0 (that is the check digit).
The full EGN is 1547121580.

== Misuse ==
In order to easily cross borders criminals have been known to change EGNs. There were 46 such cases detected in March 2005.

Using the EGN system for identification raised some privacy concerns, though they are officially considered personal information and are protected by law.

== See also ==
- National identification number
- Canada - Social insurance number
- United States - Social Security number
- United Kingdom - National Insurance number
- Australia - Tax file number
- France - INSEE code
- Spain - NIE Number
- Ireland - PPS number
- Brazil - Cadastro de Pessoas Físicas
- Yugoslavia - Unique Master Citizen Number
- Citizenship of the European Union
- Bulgarian passport
- Bulgarian identity card
- Bulgarian nationality law
- Driving licence in Bulgaria
