= Vietnamese people in Bulgaria =

Total population
- c. 2,600

Regions with significant populations
- Sofia, Plovdiv, Dimitrovgrad and Varna

Languages
- Vietnamese, Bulgarian

Religion
- Vietnamese folk religion, Mahayana Buddhism

Related ethnic groups
- Vietnamese people

Vietnamese people in Bulgaria (Bulgarian: виетнамци, vietnamtsi) form the small immigrant community of Overseas Vietnamese in Bulgaria today, but their numbers were much higher in the 1980s. As of 2015, the Vietnamese community in Bulgaria numbers 2,600, including Bulgarian residents and/or citizens. They mainly live in the capital Sofia, but also in Plovdiv, Dimitrovgrad and Varna. Many Vietnamese people also live in Kozloduy.

== History ==
Vietnamese-born people in Bulgaria
Year	Pop.	±%
2011	623	—
2012	609	−2.2%
2013	596	−2.1%
2014	631	+5.9%
2015	635	+0.6%
2016	624	−1.7%
2017	624	+0.0%
2018	636	+1.9%
2019	673	+5.8%
2020	709	+5.3%
2021	731	+3.1%

The Vietnamese diaspora in Bulgaria dates to the 1960s. In 1950, Bulgaria and Vietnam had established diplomatic relations and signed a mutual agreement to co-operate in cultural and educational affairs. As a result, the first Vietnamese students arrived in Bulgaria in 1960. The main subjects that the Vietnamese came to study were agriculture, economics, tourism, humanities, arts, medicine and construction.

According to an international agreement of 1980, Bulgaria, along with other Comecon members such as Poland, Czechoslovakia and the Soviet Union, accepted Vietnamese guest workers in the country as a relatively cheaper manual labour workforce. According to one estimate, over 35,000 Vietnamese people have worked in Bulgaria between 1980 and 1991, and 5,000 Vietnamese students have completed their higher education in various Bulgarian universities. Plattenbauten (панелка; panelka) and mobile home hostels were built in 1984 in the Krasna Polyana municipality of Sofia to accommodate the Vietnamese; by 1990, the area had acquired the nickname "Little Saigon". The hostels are still known as "the Vietnamese hostels" today, although in 2008, their demolition has been considered by the Capital Municipality as they have since decayed into an unregulated Roma-inhabited slum.

Of the thousands of Vietnamese, all but the students and those who had married in Bulgaria left. Since 1991, Bulgaria has been a target country for economic immigrants from Vietnam, as the average wages remained higher despite the country's difficulties in the 1990s. Along with the Chinese, Koreans, Arabs and other immigrants, the Vietnamese have established a presence among the vendors in Sofia's well-known and frequented bazaar Iliyantsi.

In 2008, it was widely reported and discussed that Bulgaria, now a European Union member, is again looking to employ Vietnamese workers, as unemployment in the country has been largely solved as an issue (with unemployment rates comparable to those in France or Belgium and lower than in Spain or Germany). and on the contrary, there is a lack of workers in the rapidly developing building and tourism branches in particular. Vietnamese would be offered jobs on contract terms with temporary residence in Bulgaria.

== Notable people ==
- Ani Hoang, singer.
- Chung Nguyen Do, professional footballer.

== See also ==
- Bulgaria–Vietnam relations
- Immigration to Bulgaria
- Vietnamese diaspora
