= Immigration to Bulgaria =

A process of immigration of ethnic non-Bulgarians to Bulgaria began after the country's liberation from Ottoman rule and the restoration of the Bulgarian state in 1878. The first wave of immigrants, mainly from Central and Eastern Europe, brought skills needed in the creation of the new state, with Armenian refugees, White Russians and foreign students arriving later. Since the fall of Communism and Bulgaria's entry to the European Union, immigration has increased, with many arriving legally or illegally from less developed countries, and since 2011 the country has been on a migration route used by Syrian refugees.

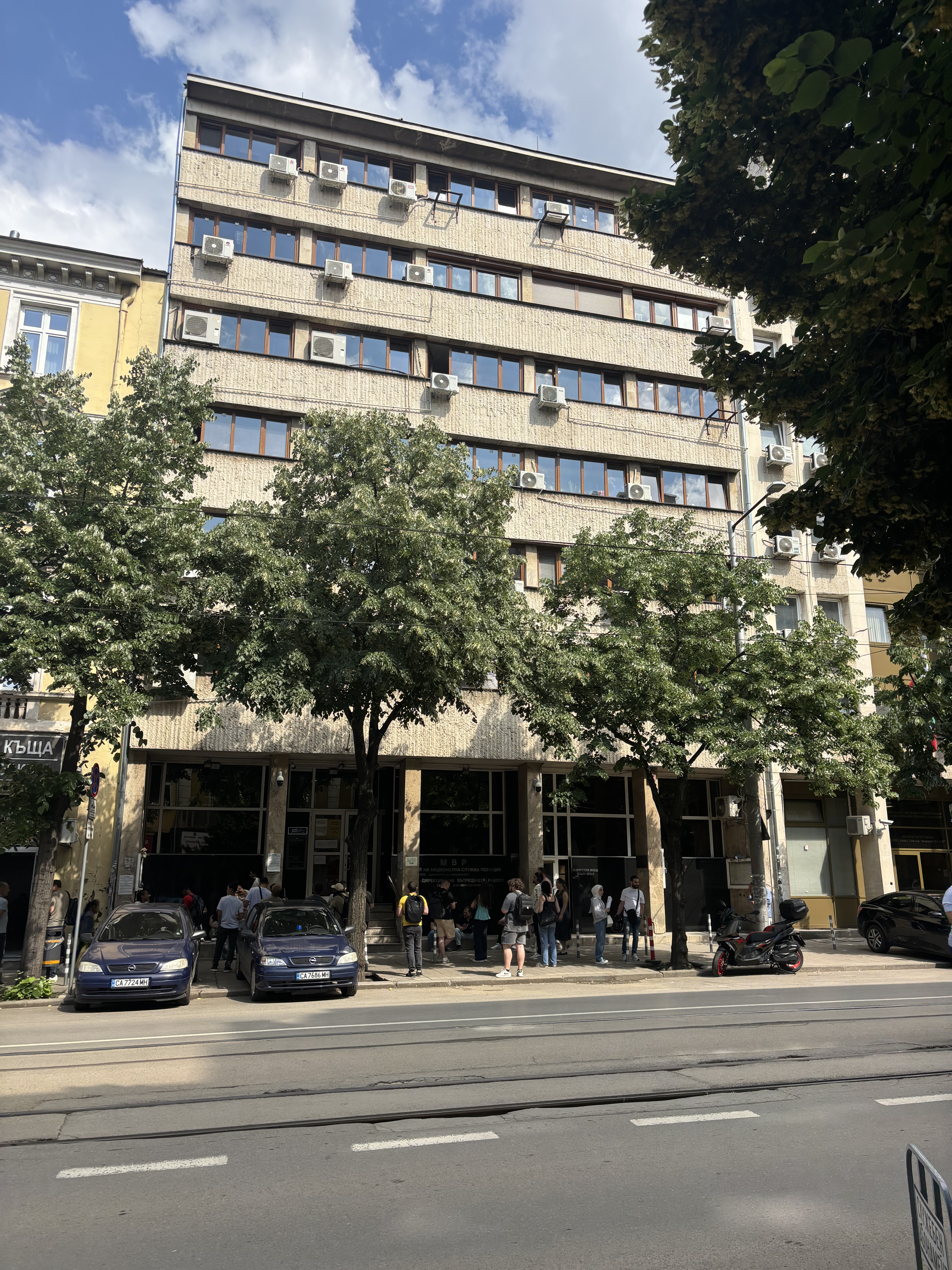
Migration Office Sofia (Visa/ Resident Permit)

In 2020, around 2.82% of the population of Bulgaria were immigrants. An increase of over 2% in the space of 30 years.

The Foreigners in the Republic of Bulgaria Act forms part of the country's immigration law and sets out conditions for foreign nationals to enter, reside in and leave Bulgaria.

== Late 19th century ==
Following the Berlin Congress, the Russian Empire was forced to withdraw its troops from Bulgaria but left a large number of specialists and functionaries who assisted the formation of the Bulgarian army and state institutions. These included Russian officers and generals, such as general Leonid Sobolev, Bulgaria's prime minister 1882–1883, general Alexander Golovin, and functionaries like Sofia's first mayor Piotr Alabin. Almost all of them left Bulgaria after the break-up of relations with Russia in 1886.

With the formation of the Principality of Bulgaria in 1878, foreign specialists, entrepreneurs, teachers, workers, and missionaries started arriving in Bulgaria and assisted the building of the new country after five centuries of foreign rule. They were notably from Austria-Hungary and Russia, as well as from Switzerland, Germany, Italy, France, the US and other European nations, who assisted in the modernisation of all aspects of life in the new Bulgarian state. Notable ethnic groups among them were the Czechs and Slovaks, such as Konstantin Josef Jireček, Hermann Škorpil, Karel Škorpil, Jiří Prošek, Ivan Mrkvička, Jaroslav Věšín. Among the temporary or permanent settlers were ethnic Jews, Germans and Austrians, Hungarians, Serbs and Montenegrins (settled in a few villages in northeastern Bulgaria), Croats, Slovenes, Poles, Ukrainians and Rusyns, and others. Czechs, Slovaks, Rusyns and Germans of Protestant and Catholic denomination from Austria-Hungary founded or settled in villages in northern Bulgaria, such as Voyvodovo, Vratsa Province, Martvitsa (Slovak Mŕtvica, now Podem), Gorna Mitropolia, Brashlyanitsa. The relative freedom of religion allowed Catholic workers and missionaries and Protestant missionaries, mostly from the United States and Great Britain, to establish missions and live for shorter or longer periods in Bulgaria.

The first larger compact group of non-Bulgarian immigrants in contemporary Bulgarian history to settle in the country were the Armenian refugees fleeing the persecutions in the Ottoman Empire. Their settlement started in the 1890s and expanded during the time of the Armenian genocide.

== 20th century ==
A large wave of Russians, Ukrainians, Belarusians and other nationals of the Russian Empire settled temporarily or permanently in Bulgaria following the demise of Wrangel's army in Crimea in 1920.

A smaller wave of new immigrants arrived in Bulgaria during the socialist regime (1944–1989), when large numbers of foreign students came to study in Bulgarian universities and many of them remained. Most of them married Bulgarian nationals and settled in the country. Also at that time, many Bulgarians married citizens of the then Soviet Union and the Eastern Bloc.

The fall of communism at the end of 1989 saw greater migration to Bulgaria, when large groups of Chinese, Arabs, Russians, Ukrainians, Turks, Vietnamese, Albanians, a number of Armenians from Armenia, some Africans, and an increasing number of EU nationals established themselves permanently in Bulgaria.

== 21st century ==
Foreign-born population in Bulgaria
Year	Pop.	±%
2011	78,621	—
2012	85,076	+8.2%
2013	96,113	+13.0%
2014	109,239	+13.7%
2015	120,635	+10.4%
2016	131,924	+9.4%
2017	139,655	+5.9%
2018	149,096	+6.8%
2019	162,346	+8.9%
2020	176,321	+8.6%
2021	188,519	+6.9%
2022	142,214	−24.6%
2023	168,595	+18.6%
2024	211,839	+25.6%

The country's accession to the EU on January 1, 2007 has not yet led to a significant rise in immigrants, although there is a growth in the number of refugees from Afghanistan, Iraq, Sub-Saharan Africa, Armenia and some Christian Palestinians. The slow procedures of granting asylum and refugee status, the low living standard compared to the EU average and the postponement of entry to the Schengen area contribute to the low number of refugees and asylum seekers.

The recent decade saw a growth of private businesses opened by citizens of Russia, Ukraine, Turkey, China, Bosnia and Herzegovina and the countries in the Middle East, notably Syria and Lebanon. Also during the last decade, Russian, Ukrainian, EU and US citizens purchased holiday properties along the Black sea coast, as well as in the interior.

According to official data, the number of permanent foreign residents in Bulgaria as of December 2008 is 66,806 and the vast majority of these come from Russia (21,309), Ukraine (5,350), the Republic of North Macedonia (4,375), Turkey (3,828) and Moldova (2,203). This number does not include immigrants who have already obtained Bulgarian citizenship or illegal immigrants. The number of immigrants in Bulgaria was expected to grow as a result of the accession of Bulgaria in the European Union in 2007.

The number of people that were born outside Bulgaria grew from 21,510 in 1990 to 168,516 in 2019.

Since the beginning of the Syrian Civil War in 2011, the number of Syrian refugees in Bulgaria has grown. Together with the Syrian refugee families, many illegal migrants, mainly males, from countries like Algeria, Morocco, Tunisia, Mali, Niger, Nigeria, Chad, Eritrea, Somalia, Afghanistan, Pakistan, Iran, and Iraq entered illegally through the Bulgarian-Turkish border. In 2014 the Bulgarian government started to build a fence at the Bulgarian-Turkish border, which was completed in the year 2017. Several people died en route from Turkey to Bulgaria. From 2022-2023 nearly 100 refugees died.

== See also ==
- Arabs in Bulgaria
- Armenians in Bulgaria
- Chinese people in Bulgaria
- Czechs and Slovaks in Bulgaria
- Germans in Bulgaria
- Jews in Bulgaria
- Roma in Bulgaria
- Russians in Bulgaria
- Serbs in Bulgaria
- Turks in Bulgaria
- Vietnamese people in Bulgaria
- Demographics of Bulgaria
- Immigration to Europe
- List of countries by immigrant population
- List of sovereign states and dependent territories by fertility rate
