= Chinese people in Bulgaria =

Total population
- 5,000—10,000

Regions with significant populations
- Nadezhda, Sofia

Languages
- Mandarin and other varieties of Chinese, Bulgarian

Related ethnic groups
- Han Chinese, Zhonghua minzu

Chinese-born (including Hong Kong) people in Bulgaria
| Year | Pop. | ±% |
|---|---|---|
| 2012 | 882 | — |
| 2013 | 929 | +5.3% |
| 2014 | 1,054 | +13.5% |
| 2015 | 1,236 | +17.3% |
| 2016 | 1,219 | −1.4% |
| 2017 | 1,263 | +3.6% |
| 2018 | 1,350 | +6.9% |
| 2019 | 1,469 | +8.8% |
| 2020 | 1,672 | +13.8% |
| 2021 | 1,769 | +5.8% |

Chinese people (Bulgarian: китайци, kitaytsi; see Cathay) in Bulgaria (simplified Chinese: 保加利亚; traditional Chinese: 保加利亞; pinyin: Bǎojiālìyà) form a small part of the Overseas Chinese community. According to estimates by members of the community, the Chinese in Bulgaria number around 5,000, although Bulgarian researchers put the figure at around 10,000.

Chinese are among the most recent immigrants to Bulgaria, the vast majority of them arriving after the democratic changes in 1989, and particularly from 1992 on; prior to 1989, only a dozen Chinese lived in Bulgaria. Most Chinese in Bulgaria are economic immigrants and small-scale investors in particular. The bulk of the Chinese live in the capital Sofia, particularly in the municipality of Nadezhda and its neighbourhoods of Nadezhda, Tolstoy and Svoboda. Although there is no discernible Chinatown, it is thought that one might develop in the following years. Most of the Chinese were urban dwellers in China, a large number coming from the provinces of Zhejiang and Fujian, with fewer from Sichuan, Shandong, Jilin, Beijing and Hong Kong. According to the media, 2,000 – 3,000 Chinese immigrate to Bulgaria every year. However, with the financial turmoil in the EU and Bulgaria, this figure has greatly decreased.

The most typical and indeed most visible occupation of the Bulgarian Chinese is the management of Chinese restaurants, although they are also known as shopkeepers (with a permanent presence in Sofia's large and frequented bazaar Iliyantsi), engaging in both retail and wholesale trade. Some have also been involved in agriculture, for example producing and selling Chinese cabbage. Traditional Chinese medicine and Chinese art are also very popular. As many Chinese come from Southern China, they speak a variety of dialects (such as Min) in addition to Mandarin Chinese. Among the main factors attracting Chinese to Bulgaria is the lower competition enabling more economic opportunities for the immigrants, the availability of more personal space and the lack of a one-child policy. The Chinese in Bulgaria come from a variety of religious and cultural backgrounds; the majority are atheist, but there are also Buddhists, Confucians, Taoists, Christians, Jehovah's Witnesses, etc.

The Chinese New Year is celebrated among family circles. A magazine called Kitay ("China") is issued by the community in Bulgarian. The People's Republic of China has had diplomatic relations with Bulgaria since 3 October 1949: Bulgaria was the second country in the world to recognize the PRC and has not recognized the Republic of China (Taiwan). The PRC has an embassy in Sofia, which used to be located in the Yablanski House.

== See also ==
- Bulgaria–China relations
- Immigration to Bulgaria
- Chinese diaspora
