= Ani Hoang =

Ani Hoang Ани Хоанг
- Born: Ani Fuk Chong Hoang; 1 August 1991 (age 34); Sofia, Bulgaria
- Genres: Pop rap; R&B; hip-hop; pop; chalga
- Occupations: Singer; rapper
- Years active: 2011–present
- Label: Payner

Ani Fuk Chong Hoang (Bulgarian: Ани Фук Чонг Хоанг; Vietnamese: Ani Phúc Chông Hoàng; born 1 August 1991) is a Bulgarian singer and rapper of Vietnamese descent.

== Biography ==
Hoang was born on August 1, 1991, in Sofia, Bulgaria. Her father is from Vietnam. She has an older brother and sister. She studied for five years at the School of Music Lubomir Pipkov in Sofia, specializing in piano.

At the end of 2009, Hoang signed a contract with Nikolay Parvanov – Chita and started working in Real Enterprises. On March 14, 2010, her first song Кой си ти (Who You Are) was released. After a series of media scandals related to her departure from Real Enterprises, she signed a contract with Payner in early April 2011. On April 8, 2011, she released the music video of her first song with Payner, Не вярвам (Do not Believe). After this, she released Лекарство за мъж (Medication for a Man) on June 18, 2011. The track achieved significant success in the charts, reaching 10th in the top 50 of the Signal music portal. Ani Hoang's next song bears the name И се будя пак (And I Wake Again) and appears in the air on Planeta TV in autumn 2011. On December 17, the clip goes to the song Неподготвен (Unprepared). For Planet's Christmas program, Annie shoots the ballad Тази нощ (Tonight) and shortly after, she also presents a new song Луда обич (Crazy Love). In March 2012, Annie Hoang won a 2011 debut in a series of annual awards for Planet TV and New Folk.

After this, she released the songs Да си правим щастие (Let's Make Happiness, duet with Alex Linares), Ако от теб си тръгна (If You're Going Out), and Загасете светлините (Shut Out the Lights), the last of which becomes the biggest hit of the singer so far. On January 4, 2013, her debut album Лекарство за мъж" (A medicine for a man) appeared on the song of the same name. The album contains 12 tracks: 9 familiar compositions, one unrelated duet Онези малки неща (Those Little Things, with DJ Ned), an electronic remix of Луда обич, and symphonic version of Не вярвам.

Ani Hoang released her first, and so far only album Лекарство за мъж in 2013.

At the end of February, Ani's new song titled Виетнамчето (Vietnamese) was released. On June 7, Скрий му очите (Hide His Eyes) was released.

In the beginning of 2014, Да го правим (Let's Do It) was released. Ani Hoang's new video is on the song – Официална бивша (Officially Former) is coming out in June. It's the music of Avi Benedy. On June 21 she, Galin and Kristiana was promoted the song Между нас (Between Us) is the title of the new pop-folk song, which in music video was filmed popular Bulgarian actress in the subject line Latinka Petrova. On December 13, the song Боли да ме обичаш (You Love Me Loves) comes out with the clip, taking the singer with the vocals Azis and the music is the work of the singer's cowl. At the end of the year, Annie Hoang introduced her new song, Благодаря ти (Thank you), to the Planet TV fest, and the video comes out in early March.

On April 23, 2015, a new video and song were released: Имам новина (I have a news). The choreography in the video is performed by Ballet Fame. On September 23, she released a video for the single Като нощ и ден (Like Night and Day). At the end of the year, she presented her new project titled Няма да те бавя (I Will not Hold You). On February 29, a new single along with its video was released: Стой далеч от мен (Stay away from me). On June 20, along with a video, comes the song На саниметри (Inches). At the beginning of September, with a video, the song Пак съм твоя (I'm yours again) is released.

In early 2017 Hoang released R&B remix of Луда Обич (originally Не си играй) with rapper Dgs Onemiconemc. In May 2017, Hoang released a music video of her hip-hop song К'во ме гледаш (You look at me).

== Personal life ==
She is engaged with the director and singer Ludmil Ilarionov since 2012.

== Awards ==
Planeta TV Awards

- 2012: Debut of the year

== Discography ==
=== Albums ===
Studio albums

- 2013 Лекарство за мъж (Medicine for a man)

=== Videos / Songs ===
- From album Лекарство за мъж:
  - 2011: Не вярвам
  - 2011: Лекарство за мъж
  - 2011: И се будя пак
  - 2011: Неподготвен
  - 2012: Луда обич
  - 2012: Да си правим щастие
  - 2012: Ако от теб си тръгна
  - 2012: Загасете светлините
- Various
  - 2013: Виетнамчето
  - 2013: Скрий му очите
  - 2013: Целувай и хапи
  - 2013: Точно по мярка
  - 2013: Ако питаш пиян ли съм (ремикс)
  - 2013: Малко шум за Ани Хоанг
  - 2014: Да го правим
  - 2014: Официално бивша
  - 2014: Между нас (with Kristiana (singer) and Galin (singer))
  - 2014: Боли да ме обичаш (with Azis)
  - 2015: Благодаря ти
  - 2015: Имам новина.
  - 2015: Като нощ и ден
  - 2015: Няма да те бавя
  - 2016: Стой далеч от мен
  - 2016: На сантиметри
  - 2016: Пак съм твоя
  - 2017: Луда обич (R'n'B remix feat. Dgs Onemiconemc)
  - 2017: К'во ме гледаш

== Filmography ==
Year	Film / TV series	Role
2013	Family	Kim
