= Nidal Algafari =

Bulgarian director

- Born: Nidal Algafari; December 18, 1965 (age 60); Sofia, Bulgaria

Nidal Algafari (Bulgarian: Нидал Алгафари, Arabic: نضال الغفاري; born December 18, 1965) is a Bulgarian director, former executive director of the Bulgarian National Television and political PR of Arab descent. He is a NATFIZ graduate. His father is Syrian, and his mother is Bulgarian. He is married to Madlen Algafari, with whom they have a son and a daughter.

Author and director of the student-run TV program Ku-Ku. Chief editor of 'Show and entertainment programs' for BNT. Director of a feature film 'La donna e mobile'. Producer and director of TV broadcasts 'Nablyudatel' (Bulgarian: Наблюдател, literally 'Observer') and 'Anonsi' (Bulgarian: Анонси, Future events or Announcements). Nidal Algafari is director of the documentary film 'Syria - history and legends'. From June 2002 to May 2004 he was the executive director of the Bulgarian National Television.
