= Bulgaria–Vietnam relations =

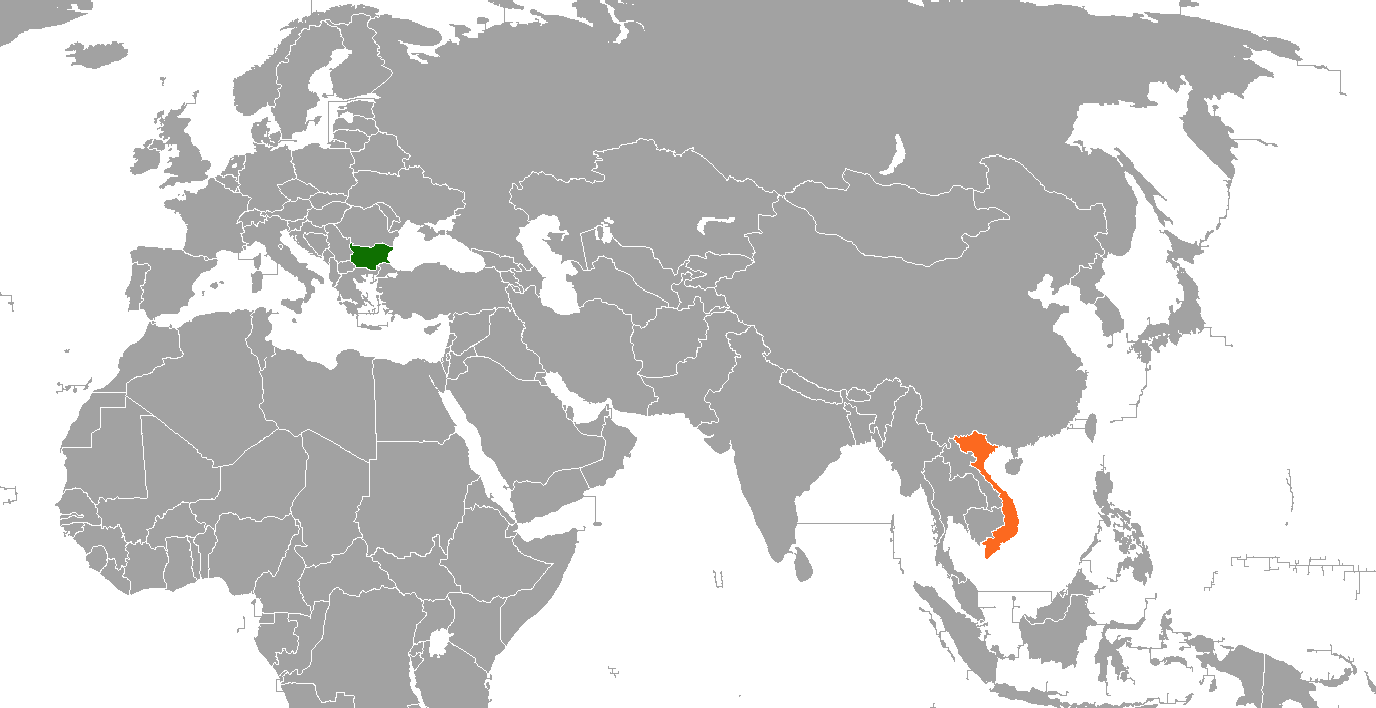

- Bulgaria: Vietnam

Bulgaria–Vietnam relations are foreign relations between Bulgaria and Vietnam. Both countries established diplomatic relation on February 8, 1950. Bulgaria has an embassy in Hanoi. Vietnam has an embassy in Sofia.

== Cooperation ==
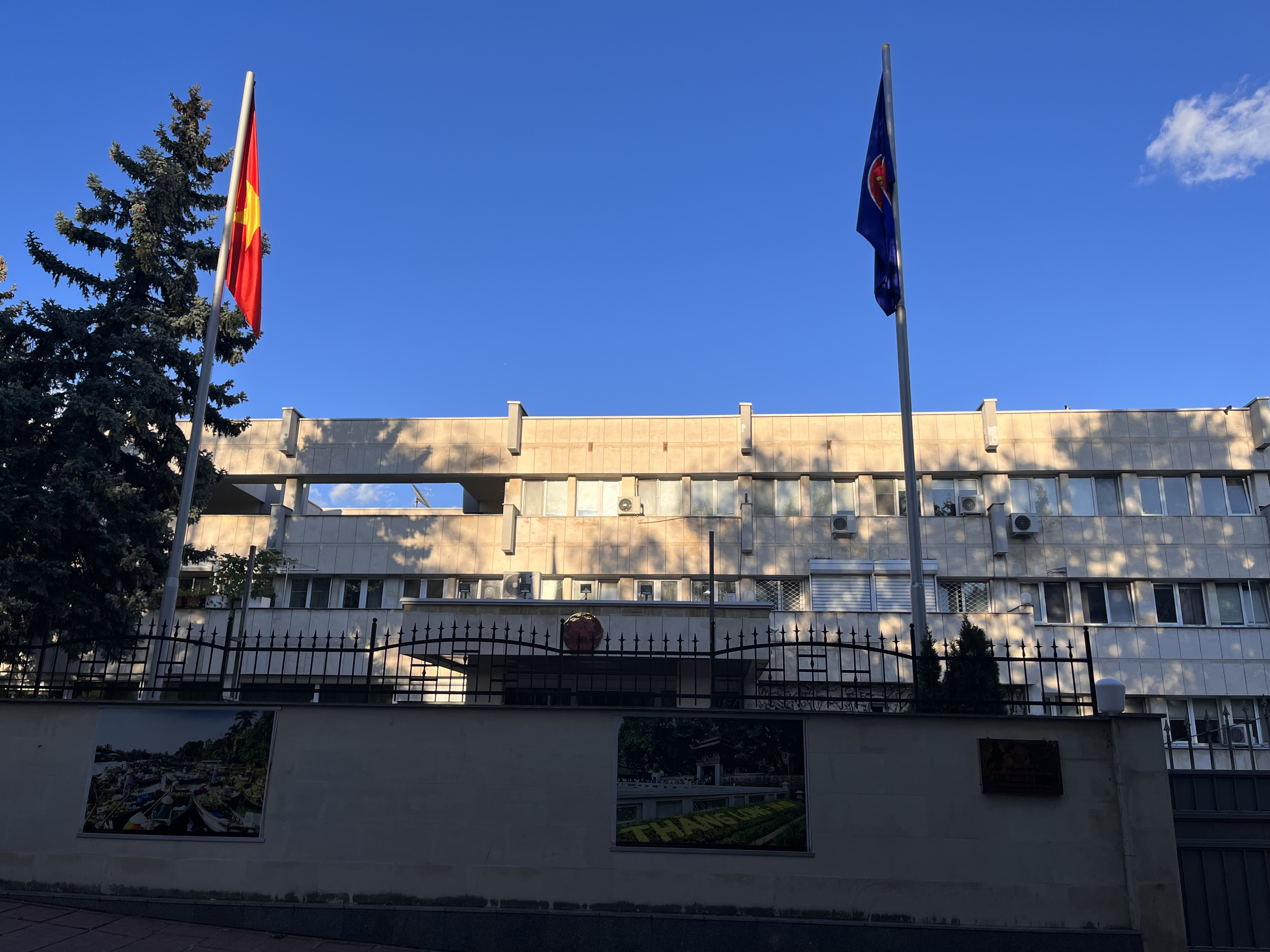
Embassy of Vietnam in Sofia

In 2006, the Bulgarian Government agreed to a healthcare cooperation plan with Vietnam. The two-year plan includes cooperation in many areas, mainly in public healthcare, inpatient and outpatient help, food security, medical education.

In 2025, Both countries have made continuous efforts to enhance and consolidate bilateral relations through regular exchanges of high-level delegations, the establishment of the Intergovernmental Committee and regular political consultations, the implementation of numerous agreements and cooperative programmes, and mutual support at international forums.

== Resident diplomatic missions ==
- Bulgaria has an embassy in Hanoi.
- Vietnam has an embassy in Sofia.

== See also ==
- Foreign relations of Bulgaria
- Foreign relations of Vietnam
- Vietnamese people in Bulgaria
