= Bulgarian passport =

Travel document

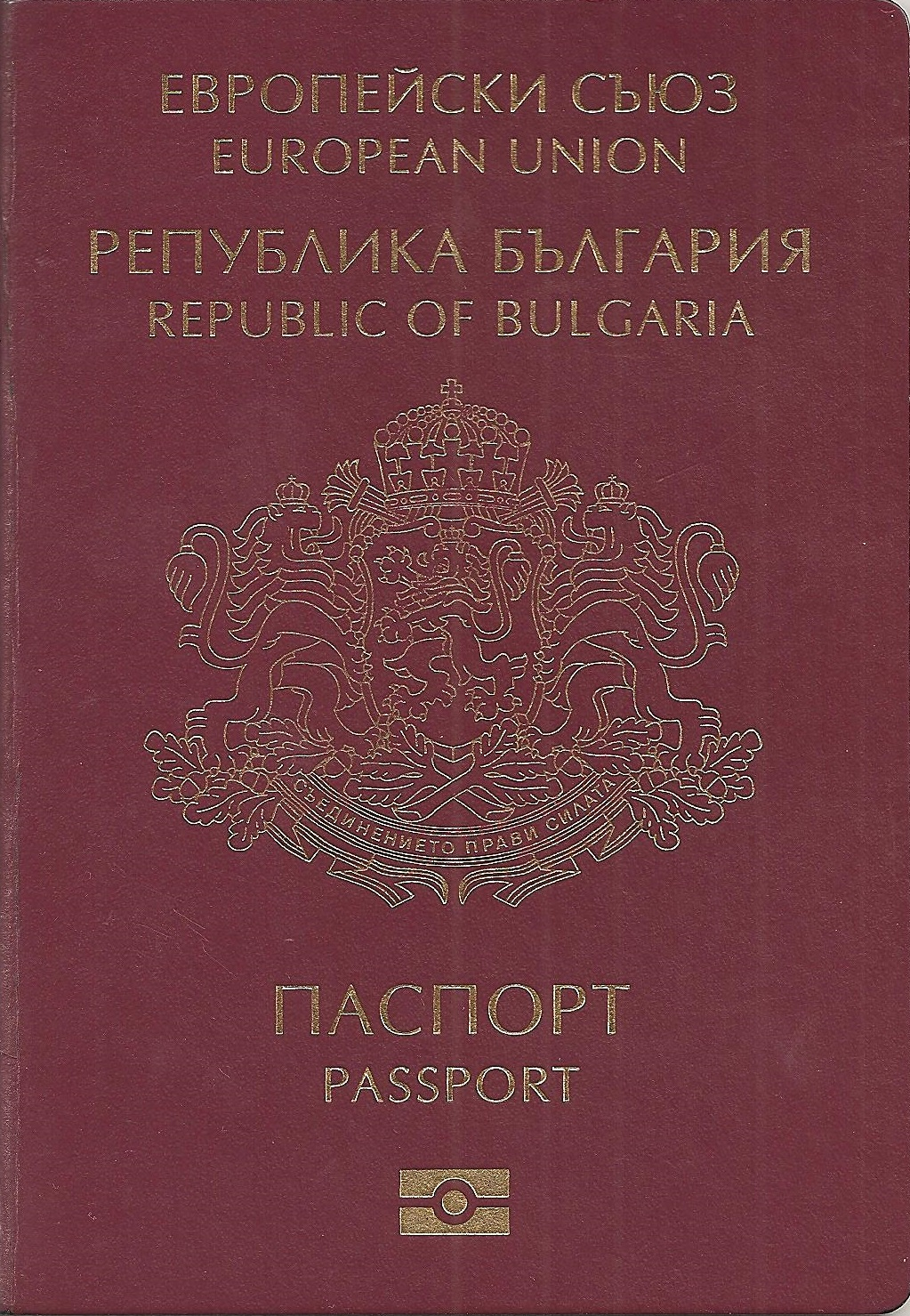
- The front cover of a contemporary Bulgarian biometric passport

- The data page of a contemporary Bulgarian biometric passport
- Type: Passport
- Issued by: Ministry of Interior
- First issued: 29 March 2010 (original biometric version); 27 April 2026 (latest 10-year biometric version)
- Purpose: Identification and travel abroad
- Eligibility: Bulgarian citizenship
- Expiration: 10 years
- Cost: €20.45 (adults aged 14-58); €10.23 (under 14 and 58-70); €5.11 (over 70)

A Bulgarian passport (Bulgarian: Български паспорт, romanized: Bŭlgarski pasport) is an international travel document issued to nationals of Bulgaria, and may also serve as proof of Bulgarian citizenship. Besides enabling the bearer to travel internationally and serving as indication of Bulgarian citizenship, the passport facilitates the process of securing assistance from Bulgarian consular officials abroad or other European Union member states in case a Bulgarian consular is absent, if needed.

As of 24 June 2026 Bulgarian citizens have visa-free or visa on arrival access to 178 countries and territories, ranking the Bulgarian passport 11th overall in terms of travel freedom according to the Henley & Partners Passport Index. Bulgarian citizens can live and work in any country within the EU as a result of the right of free movement and residence granted in Article 21 of the EU Treaty.

Every Bulgarian citizen is also a citizen of the European Union. The passport, along with the national identity card allows for free rights of movement and residence, establishment and employment in any of the states of the European Union and EFTA.

== Application ==
The Ministry of Interior is responsible for the issuing and renewing of Bulgarian passports.

== Use ==
For travel within the European Union, Schengen Area as well as to Albania, Bosnia and Herzegovina, Georgia, Kosovo, Moldova, Montenegro, North Macedonia, North Cyprus, Serbia and Turkey Bulgarian citizens are not required to carry a passport and only need a valid national identity cards.

A Bulgarian passport gives its bearer the right to assistance and protection by Bulgarian diplomatic missions and consular offices abroad (or to those of other EU member states when there is no Bulgarian diplomatic mission or consulate in the destination country or territory).

The passport remains the property of the Republic of Bulgaria.

== Categories ==
- Regular - available to all Bulgarian citizens and valid for five or ten years.
- Service - issued to their staff on request by the respective government agency or directorate.
- Diplomatic - issued to diplomats, high-ranking state officials and their immediate families.

== Physical appearance ==
Bulgarian passports are of the common EU design, burgundy in color, with the Bulgarian Coat of arms emblazoned in the center of the front cover. The text "Европейски съюз" (Bulgarian) / "European Union" (English), the country's official long name "Република България" (Bulgarian) and the English form "Republic of Bulgaria" are inscribed in capital letters above the coat of arms, with the word "паспорт" (Bulgarian) / "passport" (English) underneath. It is issued for a period of five or ten years, and contains 32 or 48 pages.

Security features include holographic images, micro printing, UV-visible features, watermarks, etc. In addition, the passport holder's photograph is digitally printed directly onto the paper, in standard ink as well as a holographic image. All passports are machine-readable.

=== Biometric passports ===
Since 29 March 2010, all newly issued Bulgarian passports contain a chip with biometric data, and also feature the text "Европейски съюз" (Bulgarian) / "European Union" (English) above the country's official name, thus reflecting Bulgaria's EU membership. Additional design changes include the placement of pictures of famous Bulgarian landmarks and monuments on the inside pages of the passports.

A significant update to the document system took effect on 27 April 2026, when Bulgaria completed its transition to a fully centralized system for personalizing identity documents. This upgrade introduced a new generation of biometric international passports featuring a higher level of security, and formally cemented the 10-year validity period for adult passports.

The standard (within 30 business days) passport service fee for adults aged 14-58 is €20.45, with lower fees for those younger or older than age group. Prices for expedited (3 business days) and urgent (8 business hours) passport services are roughly twice and five-times, respectively, more expensive than the standard fees.

=== Passport note ===
The passports contain a note from the issuing state that is addressed to the authorities of all other states, identifying the bearer as a citizen of that state and requesting that he or she be allowed to pass and be treated according to international norms. The note inside Bulgarian passports states:

The Government of the Republic of Bulgaria requests all Civil and Military Authorities to let through the holder of this passport without hindrance and, in case of need, to render him/her the necessary aid and assistance in accordance with the international law.

This passport is valid for all countries.

=== Languages ===
The data page/information page is printed in Bulgarian, English and French.

== Visa requirements ==
Visa requirements for Bulgarian citizens Bulgaria Freedom of movement Visa free Visa issued upon arrival eVisa Visa available both on arrival or online Visa required prior to arrival

As of 8 September 2023, Bulgarian citizens have visa-free or visa on arrival access to 177 countries and territories, ranking the Bulgarian passport 14th overall in terms of travel freedom according to the Henley & Partners Passport Index.

== Visitor statistics ==
According to the National Statistical Institute of Bulgaria, these were the top 10 destination countries for Bulgarians:

Rank	Destination	2014	2016
1	Turkey	1 106 913	1 218 842
2	Greece	866 609	1 200 576
3	Romania	321 546	423 396
4	Serbia	316 146	404 975
5	North Macedonia	327 033	360 422
6	Germany	239 310	344 713
7	Italy	126 313	178 287
8	Austria	110 085	163 979
9	United Kingdom	101 737	141 941
10	Spain	102 417	139 418

== Gallery of historic images ==
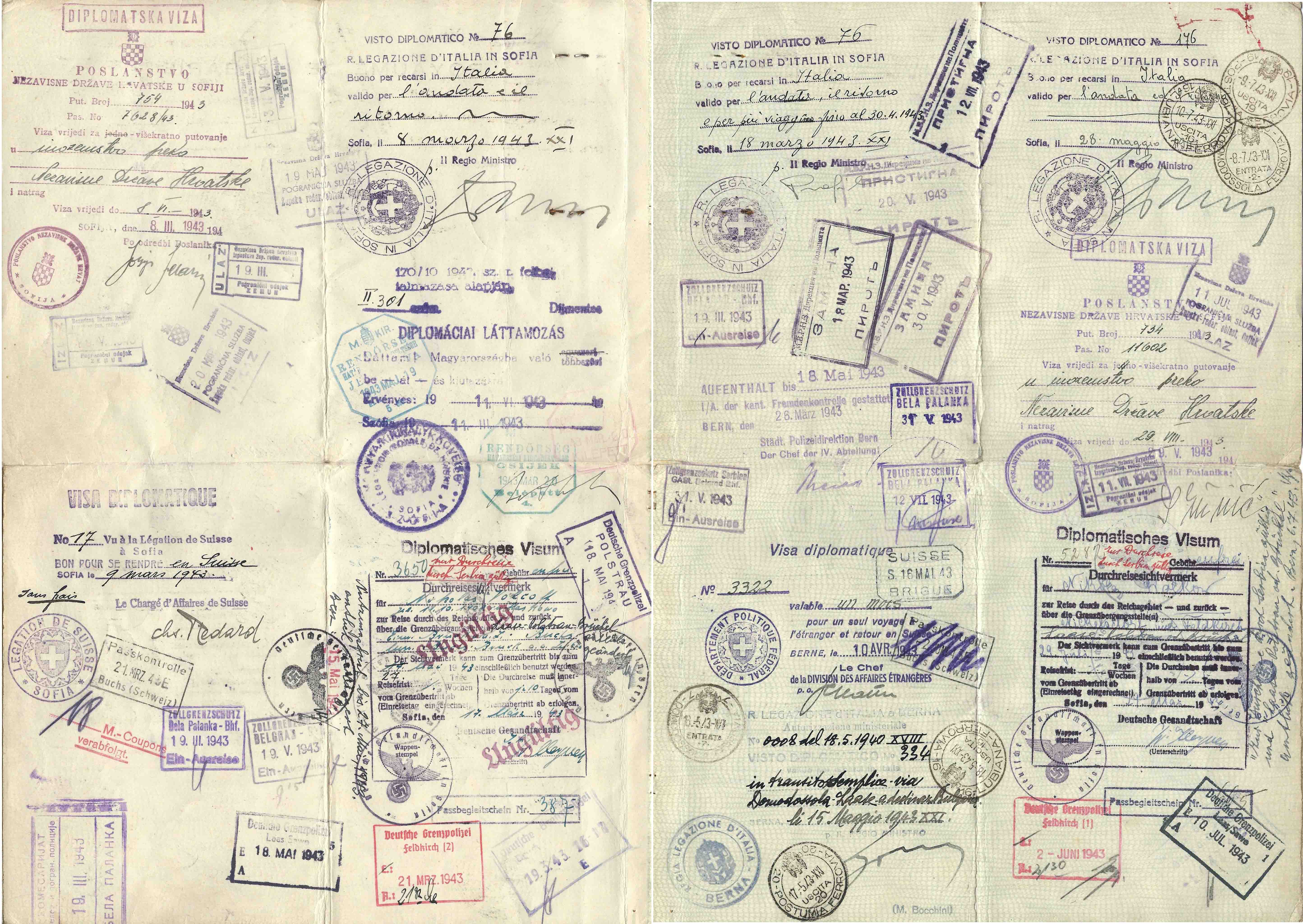
1943 pages from a Bulgarian Diplomatic passport used for travelling to Switzerland

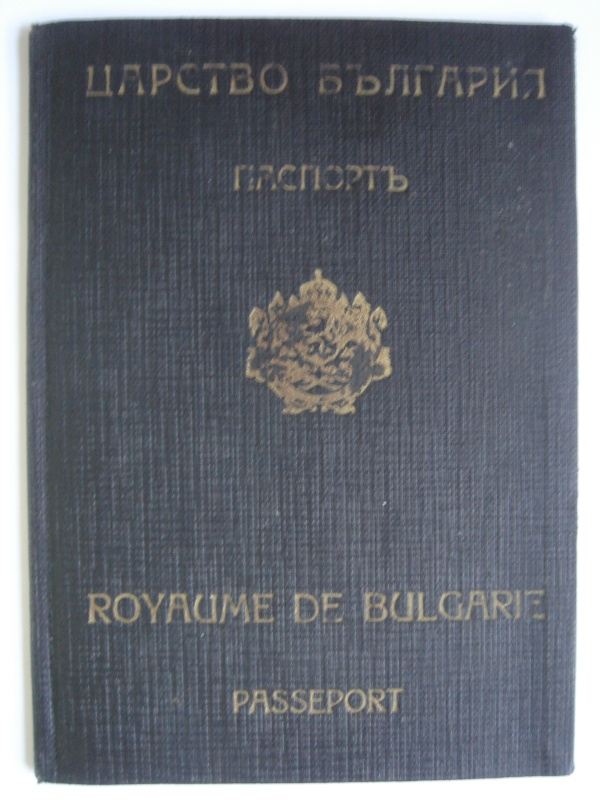
Kingdom of Bulgaria passport, circa 1944

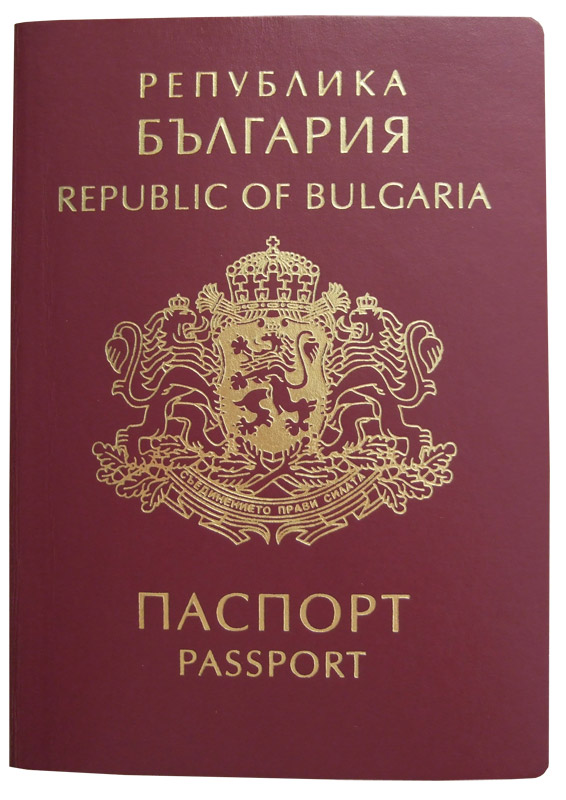
Pre-EU
Bulgarian non-biometric passport (1999-2009)

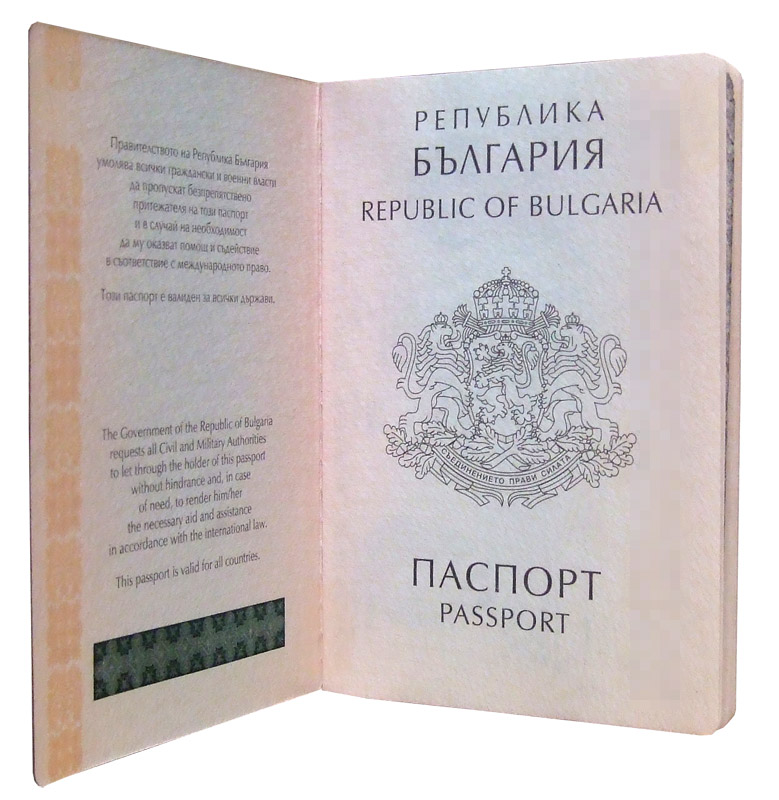
The title pages
(1999-2009)

== See also ==
- Bulgarian identity card
- Bulgarian nationality law
- Citizenship of the European Union
- Driving licence in Bulgaria
- Foreign relations of Bulgaria
- Passports of the European Union
- Unique citizenship number
- Visa policy of the Schengen Area
- Visa requirements for Bulgarian citizens
- List of diplomatic missions of Bulgaria
- List of passports
