= Driving licence in Bulgaria =

In Bulgaria, the driving licence (Bulgarian: Свидетелство за управление на моторно превозно средство (Certificate for driving a motorized vehicle), abbreviated СУМПС) is a governmental right given to those who request a licence for any of the categories they desire. It is required for every type of motorized vehicle.

Since 1999, the Bulgarian driving licence format was changed from that of a pink booklet to a credit-card sized plastic card, conforming to the European driving licence standard. The pink booklet had been used for several decades and thus the driving licence was and still is informally called Bulgarian: шофьорска книжка (driver's booklet).

== Obtaining a driver's licence ==
The Bulgarian driving licence can be obtained after finishing a driving school and passing a two-stage test: a theoretical test and a practical road test.

To obtain a valid driver's licence, applicants must also provide a certificate for completing a first aid course for drivers, typically administered by the Bulgarian Red Cross. A medical certificate issued by a general practitioner or a medical committee is also necessary.

Previously, a primary school diploma was sufficient to obtain a licence. However, to improve road safety and standardize driver preparation, Bulgarian law now requires applicants to have completed at least the first stage of high school education (10th grade) to be issued a driving licence.

== Categories and age limits ==
When a driving licence is issued in the Republic of Bulgaria, there are no maximum age restrictions, but medical certificates might limit validity based on the driver's health.

The minimum age limits depend on the vehicle category:

- 16 years for categories AM (mopeds), A1 (light motorcycles), and B1 (light cars).
- 18 years for categories A2 (medium motorcycles), B (passenger cars), BE, C1, and C1E.
- 21 years for categories C (heavy cargo vehicles), CE, D1, D1E, and tram/trolleybus categories.
- 24 years for categories D (buses) and A (heavy motorcycles), unless the driver has held an A2 licence for at least two years, which lowers the requirement for category A to 20 years.

== Control card (Abolished) ==
Until August 2023, in addition to the plastic card, each holder of a Bulgarian driving licence was issued a second document named the control card (Bulgarian: контролен талон). It was made of blue paper, filled in by hand, and stamped. The card served as a physical record of the driver's penalty points.

When a driver was fined for a road violation, the control card was taken by the authorities and replaced by a breach act (Bulgarian: акт за нарушение). The driver could continue driving for a limited period of time, as stated in the document. The control card was returned only after the fine was paid.

In August 2023, the control card was officially phased out and abolished by amendments to the Road Traffic Act. The points and penalties are now maintained entirely electronically in a national registry.

== Gallery of historic images ==
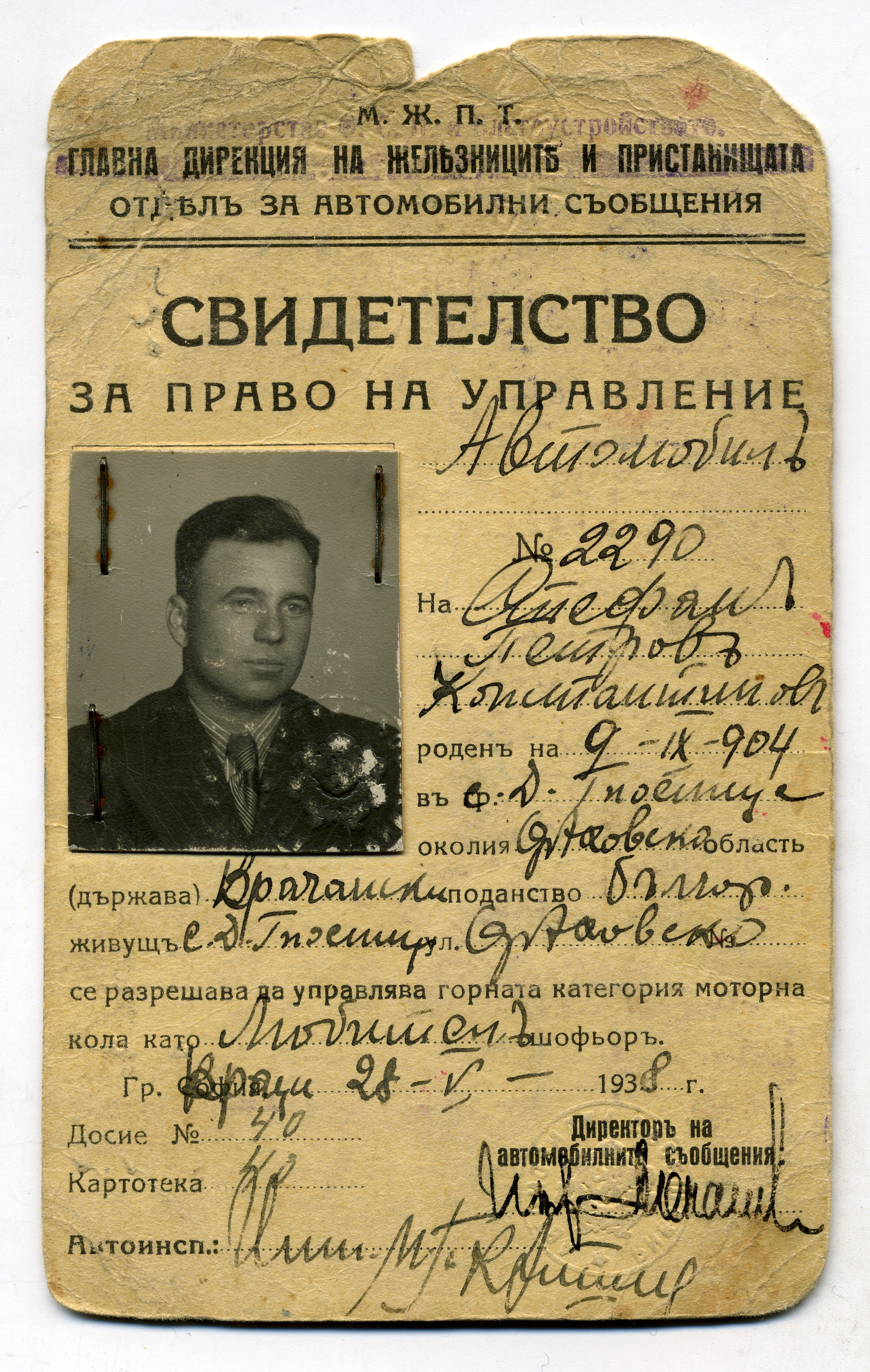
Bulgarian driving licence - 1938

== See also ==
- European driving licence
- Vehicle registration plates of Bulgaria
- Vehicle registration plates of the European Union
- Bulgarian identity card
- Bulgarian passport
