= Bulgarian identity card =

National identity card of Bulgaria

Bulgarian identity card Лична карта
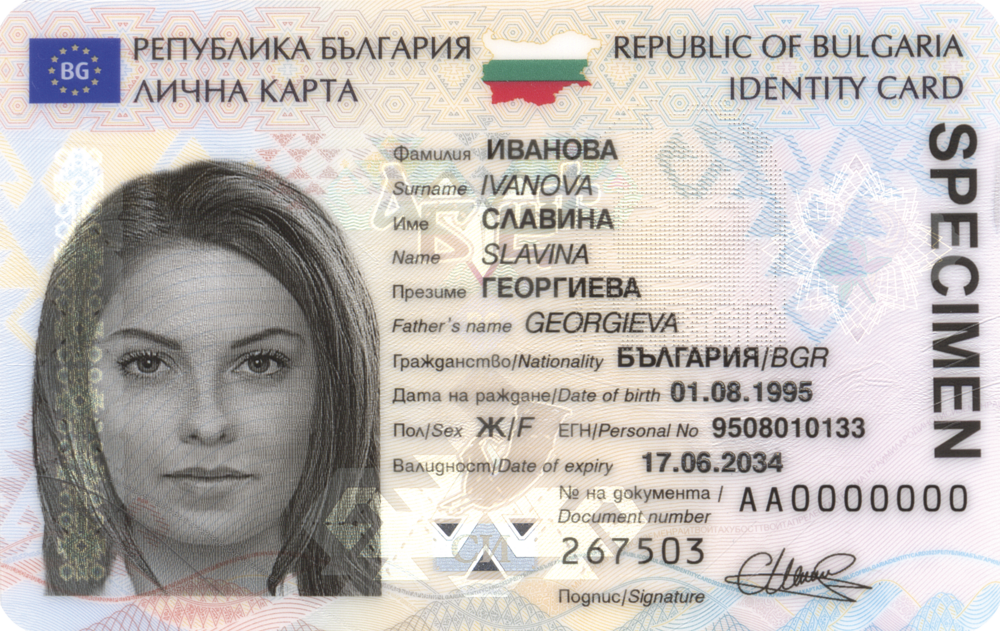
- Front of the card

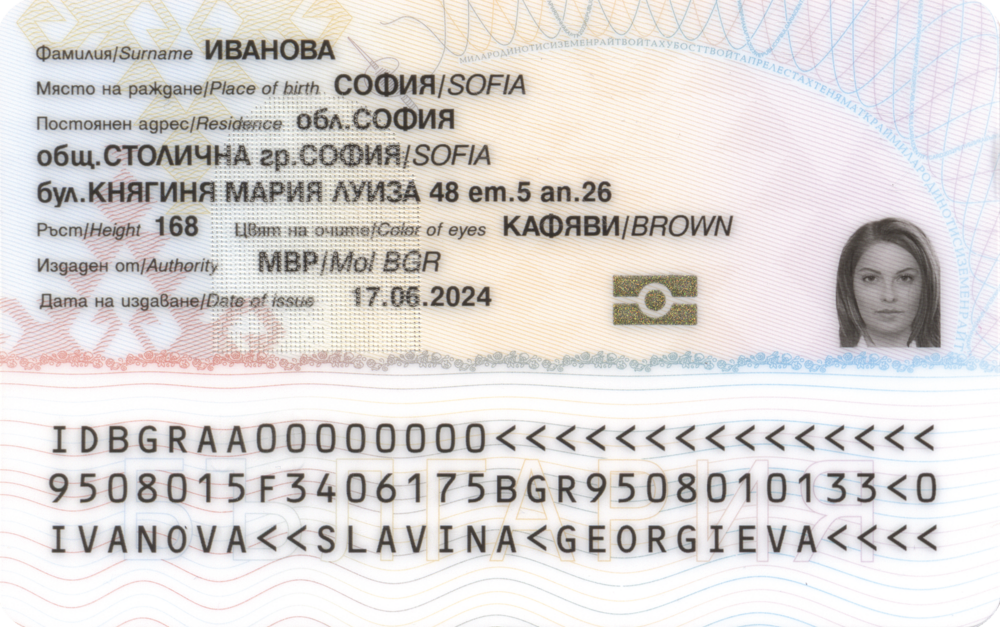
- Reverse
- Type: Compulsory identity document
- Issued by: Bulgaria
- Valid in: EFTA; European Union; United Kingdom (EU Settlement Scheme); Rest of Europe (except Belarus, Russia, and Ukraine) Georgia; Montserrat (max. 14 days); Overseas France; Turkey
- Expiration: 4 years (age 14–17); 10 years (age 18–70); 10 or 30 years (age 70 and above)
- Size: ID-1

The Bulgarian identity card (Bulgarian: лична карта, lichna karta, lit. 'personal card') is a compulsory identity document issued in Bulgaria. The document is issued by the police on behalf of the Ministry of Interior and is the main form of identification on the territory of the Republic of Bulgaria. All Bulgarians are obliged by law to carry their identity cards with them at all times and are subject to fines should they not.

Since 1 January 2007, the Bulgarian identity card can be used for travel within the European Union and the Schengen Area instead of a Bulgarian passport. In addition, the Bulgarian identity card is accepted as a travel document by European microstates, the French overseas territories, Montserrat (max. 14 days), Albania, Bosnia and Herzegovina, Georgia, Kosovo, Moldova, Montenegro, North Cyprus, North Macedonia, Serbia, Turkey.

== History ==
The Bulgarian identity card (лична карта in the Cyrillic alphabet, or "lichna karta" in the Latin transliteration of Bulgarian) is first issued and is compulsory after turning 14 years of age. The new Bulgarian ID cards were introduced in 1999. They follow the general pattern in the EU and replaced the old, Soviet-style "internal passports", also known as "green passports". On 29 March 2010 Bulgarian identity cards were updated.

A new model complying with the requirements of Regulation (EU) 2019/1157 was announced on 5 April 2023 and were released on 17 June 2024.

== Physical appearance ==
The physical appearance of the Bulgarian identity card is similar to that of a credit card, the identity card is plastic and rounded-rectangular in shape. On the left side is the photograph of the bearer. On the top edge of the card, the name Republic of Bulgaria is available in two languages, Bulgarian and English, written in capital letters, below, the name of the card is available in the same two languages and also written in capital letters. The middle part of the flag of the Republic of Bulgaria and the coat of arms of the Republic of Bulgaria are also displayed on the identity card.

Furthermore, the following information is contained on the front side of the card:

- The unique 9-digit ID number of the card
- The cardholder's full name, sex, and date of birth
- The cardholder's uniform civil number (Bulgarian: единен граждански номер; abbreviated ЕГН, EGN): a unique 10-digit number that serves as national identification number
- Date of expiry of the card
- Cardholder's signature

The back side of the identity card contains the cardholder's family name, place of birth, permanent address, height, and eye color, as well as the place where the card was issued together with the date of issue. At the bottom there is a machine-readable zone according to ICAO specifications.

== Issuing Identity Cards in Bulgaria ==
General Application Process
To obtain an identity card, applicants must complete a form available at any District Police Station and submit it to the station's Identity Documents and Passport Regime Unit (Звено "Български документи за самоличност"). The application process requires the applicant's presence to capture a digital photograph and two fingerprints. First-time applicants, such as those turning 14, are also required to present a valid birth certificate.

Requirements for Naturalized Citizens
Citizens who have acquired Bulgarian citizenship by naturalization must apply for their first identity card personally. In addition to the standard requirements, they must present: 1. The official Certificate of Bulgarian Citizenship (issued by the Ministry of Justice). 2. A valid Certificate of Permanent Address (issued by the municipal administration where the person is registered). 3. Their valid foreign passport or identity document. 4. A birth certificate (legalized and translated, if applicable).

Online Renewal (Electronic Services)
Bulgarian citizens can also renew their identity cards online via the Ministry of Interior’s e-services portal. This requires a valid Qualified Electronic Signature (QES). This option is strictly available only if the applicant’s biometric data (photo and fingerprints) was collected within the last 59 months. Additionally, there must be no changes to the applicant's name, permanent address, or gender. If applying online, the finished identity card must be collected personally to verify the cardholder's identity; proxies are not permitted for collection in this specific case.

Renewals via Representative (Physical Application)
For renewals where the applicant's appearance has not significantly changed, a representative with a notarized power of attorney may submit the application. However, the entire process cannot be delegated:

- Submission by Proxy: If a representative submits the application, the applicant must collect the new ID personally.
- Collection by Proxy: If the applicant submits the application personally, an authorized representative may collect the ID.

Note: This proxy option does not apply to passport applications, which strictly require the applicant's physical presence for fingerprinting during submission.

== Issuing Identity Cards outside Bulgaria ==
Bulgarian citizens residing abroad may apply for an identity card at the nearest Bulgarian diplomatic or consular mission (Embassy or Consulate General). The process is as follows:

Submission: You must appear in person to submit the application and have your biometric data (photo and fingerprints) taken. First-time applicants must present a birth certificate. Timeline: Issuance abroad takes longer than in Bulgaria, typically up to 90 days for standard service using the diplomatic pouch. Fast-Track Delivery: Applicants can pay an additional fee for DHL delivery. This expedites the transport of the finished card from Bulgaria to the consulate, significantly reducing the waiting time, though it does not speed up the printing process itself. Collection: The finished card must generally be collected personally. However, if the application was submitted personally, you may authorize a representative to collect it using a notarized power of attorney.

Online Renewal (Electronic Services)
Bulgarian citizens can also renew their identity cards online via the Ministry of Interior’s e-services portal. This requires a valid Qualified Electronic Signature (QES). This option is strictly available only if the applicant’s biometric data (photo and fingerprints) was collected within the last 59 months. Additionally, there must be no changes to the applicant's name, permanent address, or gender. If applying online, the finished identity card must be collected personally to verify the cardholder's identity; proxies are not permitted for collection in this specific case.

== Issuance and Fees ==
Applicants must pay a fee to issue a Bulgarian identity card. The cost is determined by the turnaround time requested. While the standard issuance period is 30 days, expedited options are available: an "expedited" service (3 working days) at double the standard fee, and an "express" service (8 hours) at five times the standard fee. Applicants selecting the standard service often receive their cards well before the 30-day deadline and may check the status of their document via the Ministry of Interior's online service.

== Validity and Pricing Structure as of 1 January 2026 ==
- Minors (14–17 years): Cards are valid for four years. The first card is issued free of charge; subsequent renewals cost €10.74.
- Adults (18–70 years): Cards are valid for ten years with a standard issuance fee of €15.34.
- Seniors (70+ years): Cards are issued free of charge with a validity of either 10 or 30 years.

== Gallery of historic images ==
The front of a Bulgarian national non-biometric identity card

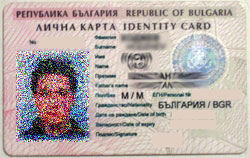
Bulgarian identity card (until 2010)

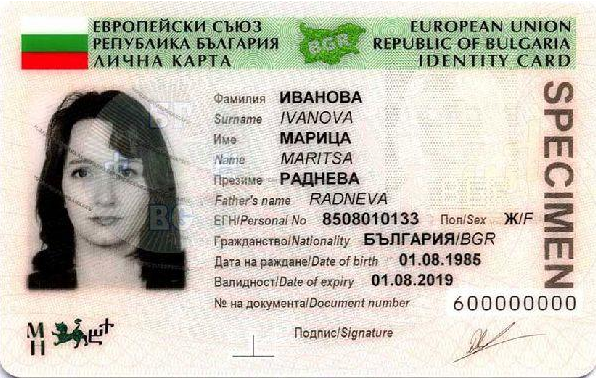
Bulgarian identity card (2010-2024)

== See also ==
- National identity cards in the European Economic Area
- Citizenship of the European Union
- Bulgarian passport
- Bulgarian nationality law
- Uniform civil number
- Driving licence in Bulgaria
- Visa requirements for Bulgarian citizens
- Visa policy of Bulgaria
- List of identity card policies by country
