= Arabs in Bulgaria =

Arabs in Bulgaria Араби в България العرب في بلغاريا
Total population
- 11,400

Regions with significant populations
- Sofia, Plovdiv, Varna, Burgas

Languages
- Arabic language Bulgarian language

Religion
- Islam and Christianity

Related ethnic groups
- Arab people, Arab diaspora, Arab Americans, Arab Argentine, Arab Brazilian, Arab Canadians, Arab Mexican

Arabs in Bulgaria (Bulgarian: Араби в България, Arabic: العرب في بلغاريا) are the people from Arab countries, particularly Lebanon, Syria, the Palestine, Iraq, and Jordan and also small groups from Egypt, Algeria, Tunisia, Morocco, Libya and Sudan, who emigrated from their native nations and currently reside in Bulgaria. In the over forty-year history of this community, 11,400 Arabs have migrated to Bulgaria. According to other data from two teams of anthropologists and sociologists, the number of Arabs in Bulgaria who are legal residents and officially have work permits was 17,000 in 2004. (the number 17,000 includes not only Arabs but also Kurds, Afghans, Berber and others.)

In addition, Bulgaria has people from Arab countries, who have the status of refugees (refugees of the Syrian civil war, but only 10% of them are Syrian Arabs, the other 90% of them are Syrian Kurds) or illegal immigrants trying to immigrate to Western Europe.

== Notable people ==
- Nidal Algafari

== See also ==
- Arab diaspora
- Arabs in Europe
- List of countries by immigrant population
- Lebanese diaspora
- Syrian diaspora
- Palestinian diaspora
- Moroccan diaspora
- Iraqi diaspora
- Egyptian diaspora
