= Bulgarian nationality law =

Bulgarian Citizenship Act

Parliament of Bulgaria
- Long title: An Act relating to Bulgarian citizenship
- Enacted by: Government of Bulgaria
- Status: Current legislation

Bulgarian nationality law is governed by the Constitution of Bulgaria (article 25 and 26) of 1991 and the citizenship law of 1999 (with changes made in various years, including significant amendments between 2021 and 2024).

It is mainly based on jus sanguinis; however, it is possible to obtain citizenship after 5 years of residence in Bulgaria. Naturalisation is available on the basis of residence in certain types of status; marriage or on the basis of origin or at the discretion of the government of Bulgaria to persons of merit. The Bulgarian Ministry of Justice is in charge of processing citizenship applications.

Every Bulgarian citizen is also a citizen of the European Union.

== Acquisition of Bulgarian citizenship ==
Bulgarian citizenship can be acquired in the following ways:

1. Jus sanguinis: By descent from a Bulgarian citizen if at least one or both of the parents or grandparents or great-grandparents is or was a Bulgarian citizen. Recent amendments have expedited this process, reducing the processing time for citizenship by origin to 9 months. Additionally, applicants for citizenship by origin are now required to demonstrate Bulgarian language proficiency, unless exempt.
2. Jus soli: By birth in Bulgaria (unless citizenship of another country has been acquired by descent), or a child found in Bulgaria whose parents are unknown;
3. By naturalisation in Bulgaria: If the applicant:
  - is 18 or older;
  - has been a holder of a permanent or long-term residence permit for at least 5 years, or 3 years if the applicant has been married to a Bulgarian national for at least 3 years, was born in Bulgaria, or settled in the country before the age of 18;
  - has not been convicted of a premeditated crime by a Bulgarian court or by a foreign court in their country of origin;
  - has a source of income or a trade and can financially support themselves;
  - has a good command of the Bulgarian language.

Previously, Bulgaria offered a Citizenship by Investment program (often referred to as a "golden passport"), which allowed foreign investors to acquire citizenship by making a substantial financial investment in government bonds or other assets. However, following pressure from the European Commission over security, corruption, and money laundering concerns, the Bulgarian Parliament officially abolished the citizenship by investment program in March 2022. While the direct citizenship route is closed, Bulgaria still operates a Golden Visa program granting permanent residency for qualifying investments in domestic funds.

== Dual citizenship ==
Bulgaria permits dual citizenship only for native-born citizens, citizens of the EU, EEA and Switzerland, countries in a reciprocity agreement with Bulgaria, as well as spouses of Bulgarian citizens. Naturalised citizens who prove they are of Bulgarian origin are also permitted.

Naturalised citizens who do not belong to at least one of the aforementioned groups are required to give up all other nationalities. Recent amendments stipulate that naturalised applicants who are required to renounce their previous citizenship must provide official proof of release from their previous citizenship within 18 months after the Citizenship Council's approval. Those who previously renounced their Bulgarian citizenship are allowed to get it reinstated. Some countries do not permit multiple citizenship e.g. adults who have acquired Bulgarian and Japanese citizenship by birth must declare, to the latter's Ministry of Justice, before turning 22, which citizenship they want to keep.

== Citizenship of the European Union ==
Since Bulgaria is member of the European Union, Bulgarian citizens are also citizens of the European Union under European Union law and thus have the right of freedom of movement within the EU and have the right to vote in elections for the European Parliament. When in a non-EU country where there is no Bulgarian embassy or representation, Bulgarian citizens have the right to receive consular protection from the embassy of any other EU country present in that third country. Bulgarian citizens can live and work in any country within the EU and EFTA as a result of the right of free movement and residence granted in Article 21 of the Treaty on the Functioning of the European Union.

== Travel freedom of Bulgarian citizens ==
Visa requirements for Bulgarian citizens Bulgaria Freedom of movement Visa free Visa issued upon arrival eVisa Visa available both on arrival or online Visa required prior to arrival

Visa requirements for Bulgarian citizens are administrative entry restrictions by the authorities of other states placed on citizens of Bulgaria. In 2015, Bulgarian citizens had visa-free or visa-on-arrival access to 150 countries and territories, ranking the Bulgarian passport 18th in the world according to the Visa Restrictions Index.

In 2017, the Bulgarian nationality is ranked twenty-sixth in the Nationality Index (QNI). This index differs from the Visa Restrictions Index, which focuses on external factors including travel freedom. The QNI considers, in addition to travel freedom, on internal factors such as peace & stability, economic strength, and human development as well.

== See also ==
- Citizenship of the European Union
- Bulgarian passport
- Bulgarian identity card
- Uniform civil number
