= Qingzhen Chan Temple =

Temple in Zhejiang, China

Coordinates: 28°04′48″N 120°10′52″E

- 清真禅寺
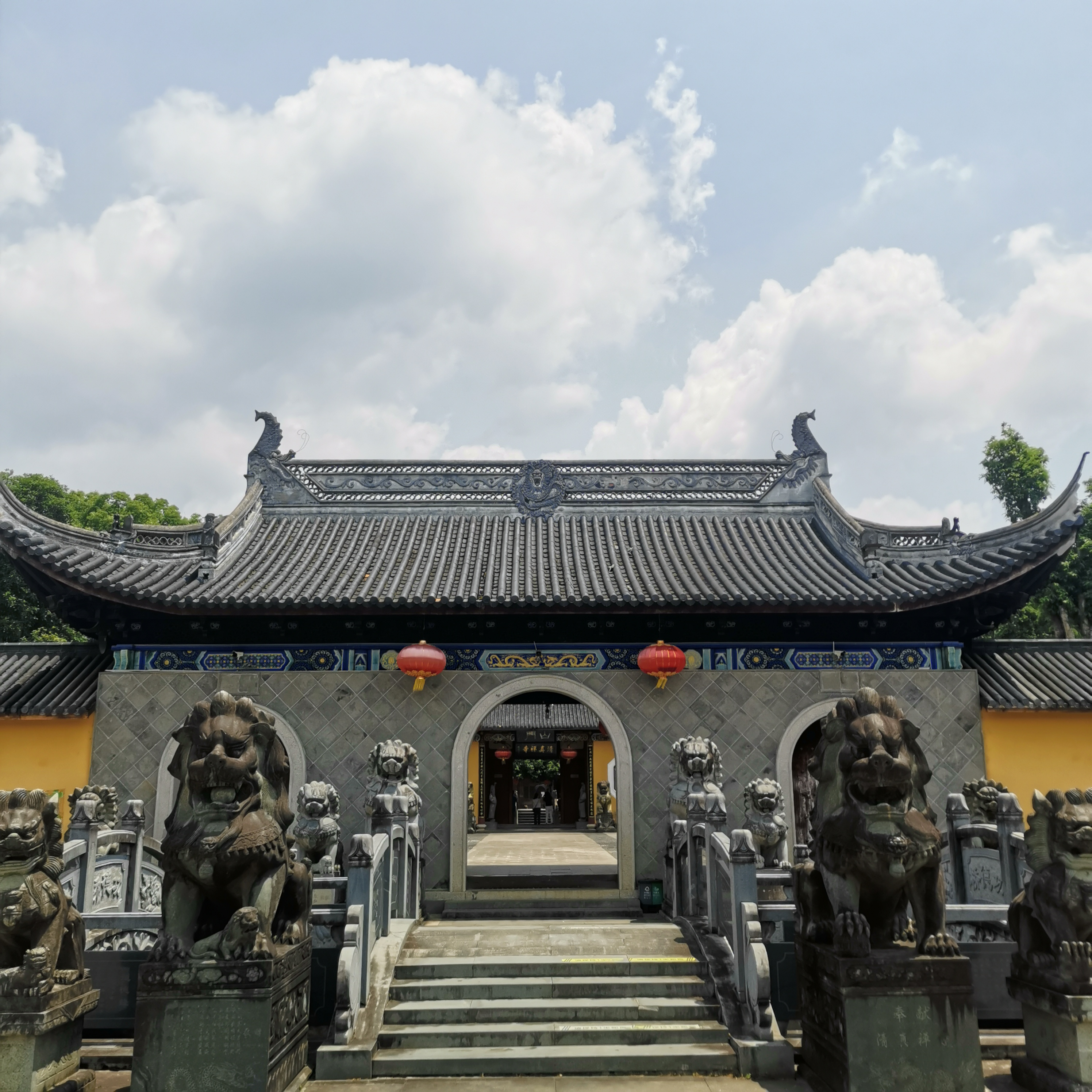

Religion
- Affiliation: Chan Buddhism, Taoism
- Deity: Primarily dedicated to the "White-Robed Grand Chancellor" Li Bi, also enshrines the Guanyin (Bodhisattva Avalokiteshvara)
- Governing body: Management Committee of the Qingzhen Chan Temple (清真禅寺管理委员会)

Location
- Location: Fushan Township, Qingtian, Zhejiang, China
- Interactive map of Qingzhen Chan Temple

Architecture
- Established: Established during the Shaoding era of the Southern Song dynasty (1228-1234)
- Elevation: 500 m (1,640 ft)

Qingzhen Chan Temple (Chinese: 清真禅寺; pinyin: Qīngzhēn Chánsì; Qingtian dialect: Ching1-cing1-zoe2-zy3) is a temple located at the foot of Mount Mianniu in Fushan Township, Qingtian County, Zhejiang Province, China. Founded during the Southern Song dynasty (1127-1279), it was originally known as Qingzhen Hall (清真堂) and initially served as a Taoist place of worship dedicated to Li Bi (李泌), a Tang dynasty statesman known as the White-Robed Chancellor (白衣丞相). Over time, it developed into a regional centre of Buddhist, Taoist and local religious traditions in southern Zhejiang, and is one of the largest temples in Lishui.

The temple underwent several expansions throughout the Yuan, Ming and Qing dynasties. In 1984, it was authorised to resume religious activities as a Buddhist temple and adopted its present name, Qingzhen Chan Temple. In 2007, it was designated a National AAA Tourist Attraction.

Qingzhen Chan Temple is also an important centre of local folk religious practices and festivals in Qingtian. Its buildings include a hall dedicated to the White-Robed Chancellor, and it preserves the tradition of the Thousand-Jin Candle (千斤烛), characterized by the use of exceptionally large ceremonial candles.

== Etymology ==
The term qingzhen (清真), literally meaning "purity and truth", has historically been used in Chinese literature and Taoist thought to express simplicity, purity, and spiritual refinement. Although the term was later adopted by and closely associated with China's Islamic culture, particularly through the term qingzhen si (清真寺) which denotes a mosque, its usage in the name of Qingzhen Chan Temple reflects an older Taoist and local religious context and should not be confused with the Islamic affiliation.

== History ==
=== Early history ===
The shrine was originally situated in a mountain hollow behind the upper part of historic Zhaitangxia village (齋堂下村), in present-day Fushan Township. As the site was confined and the growing popularity of incense offerings made further expansion difficult, it was relocated to its present location during the Shaoding era (紹定, 1228-1234) of the Southern Song dynasty, where two successive main halls were constructed. It was subsequently named Zhaitang (齋堂, literally "Fasting Hall").

During the Xianchun era (鹹淳, 1265-1274), the statue previously housed in the front hall was moved to the rear hall. The front hall was subsequently dedicated to Li Bi, the White-Robed Chancellor, and the temple adopted the name Qingzhen Hall.

Dia'ngai in the pond behind the rear hall of the Qingzhen Chan Temple

During the Dade era (大德, 1297-1306), a hall dedicated to the Fourteen Ladies (十四夫人) was constructed on the right side of the main hall.

In 1529, during the Ming dynasty, the Guanyin Hall and the Hall of the White-Robed Chancellor were renovated. Additional residential quarters for female devotees were built in 1809, during the Qing dynasty.

In 1861, the Taiping rebels captured Qingtian and entered Fushan, destroying the front hall in a fire during the conflict. Reconstruction began two years later, following the suppression of the Taiping Heavenly Kingdom's presence in the area.

In 1872, a fish pond was constructed on the western side between the front and rear halls. Further additions followed in November 1896, when a bell tower and gates on the eastern and western sides were built.

=== Republican period ===
In 1926, Qingtian was struck by a severe drought, with large section of Ou river drying up. According to local accounts, at the request of residents, Wei Zaitian, then magistrate of Qingtian, invited the statue of the White-Robed Chancellor from Qingzhen Hall to the county town for a rainmaking ceremony. It was said that the sun remained unobscured throughout the procession, but as the participants returned, dark clouds gathered over Mount Taihe, accompanied by thunder and lightning above the county. Heavy rain subsequently fell, forcing the procession to hurry back to Fushan.

A group of Fushan secondary school students in front of the Qingzhen Hall, 1940s

The thunderstorms lasted for three days and salvaged Qingtian from the drought. In response, Wei Zaitian presented 50 silver dollars and a ceremonial plaque bearing the inscription Lipèi Gānlín (立沛甘霖: Bestowing a Timely Downpour). The event attracted widespread attention in Qingtian and neighbouring counties, bringing a surge in the number of pilgrimages, incense offerings and donations to the shrine. Some affluent merchants and overseas diasporas of local descent later contributed considerable funds towards its maintenance. Donations were also used to purchase farmlands in the nearby Wenzhou, part of the income from the harvest helped establish the first ever modern secondary school in Qingtian, Fushan Private Rural Normal School (阜山私立鄉村師範學校, Fù shān sīlì xiāngcūn shīfàn xuéxiào).

=== People's Republic ===
Following the establishment of the People's Republic of China in 1949, religious activities at Qingzhen Hall were suspended. During the Cultural Revolution, which began in 1966, the hall was used as the headquarter of Fushan People's Commune. In the spring of 1967, it suffered extensive damage during the height of the Four Olds campaign, in which the shrine's bronze bells and a 300-jin tin incense burner were smashed and sold as scrap metal.

During the 1980s, religious restrictions gradually loosened as part of China's reform and opening-up policy, and calls for the resumption of religious service at Qingtian Hall grew among local residents. Zhou Kui, a local resident, proposed converting the hall into a Buddhist temple. Ye Hongxing, then head of the Qingzhen Hall Management Committee, donated more than 1,700 jin of copper, along with ancient artefacts, including precious ritual vessels and ingots that together worth over 700,000 Chinese yuan. He also presented the hall with a calligraphic plaque inscribed with the phrase Zé bèi qiáo xiāng (澤被僑鄉: Blessings upon the Overseas Chinese Homeland), written by the contemporary Chinese calligrapher Sha Menghai.

The Shanmen (山门) of Qingzhen Chan Temple, below it is a plaque with an inscription by Zhao Puchu

In 1984, the Qingtian County People's Government approved the renaming of Qingzhen Hall to Qingzhen Chan Temple and authorized its reopening as a Buddhist place of worship. That same year, the temple was designated a county-level protected cultural heritage site. It also received a plaque inscribed by Zhao Puchu, then president of the Buddhist Association of China.

Over the following decades, Qingzhen Chan Temple underwent several renovations and restorations. Buddhist statues and bronze bells were able to be reconstructed or recast. In 2010, the prorcession of the White-Robed Chancellor, which had been discontinued since 1952, was revived under the advocacy of Ye Hongxing.

== Architecture ==
Qingzhen Chan Temple occupies an area of 5,928.9 square metres (63,819 sq. ft). Its buildings feature traditional upturned eaves and roof corners, and the complex preserves relief carvings, murals and commemorative plaques and couplets inscribed by prominent figures from the Ming and Qing dynasties.

The principal strucutures within the complex include the entrance gate, the Hall of the White-Robed Chancellor, the Main Hall (Mahavira Hall), the Hall of the Ladies, the Guanyin Hall, the rear garden and the bell tower.

Hall of the Buddha's Universal Radiance

Hall of the White-Robed Chancellor

Bell tower

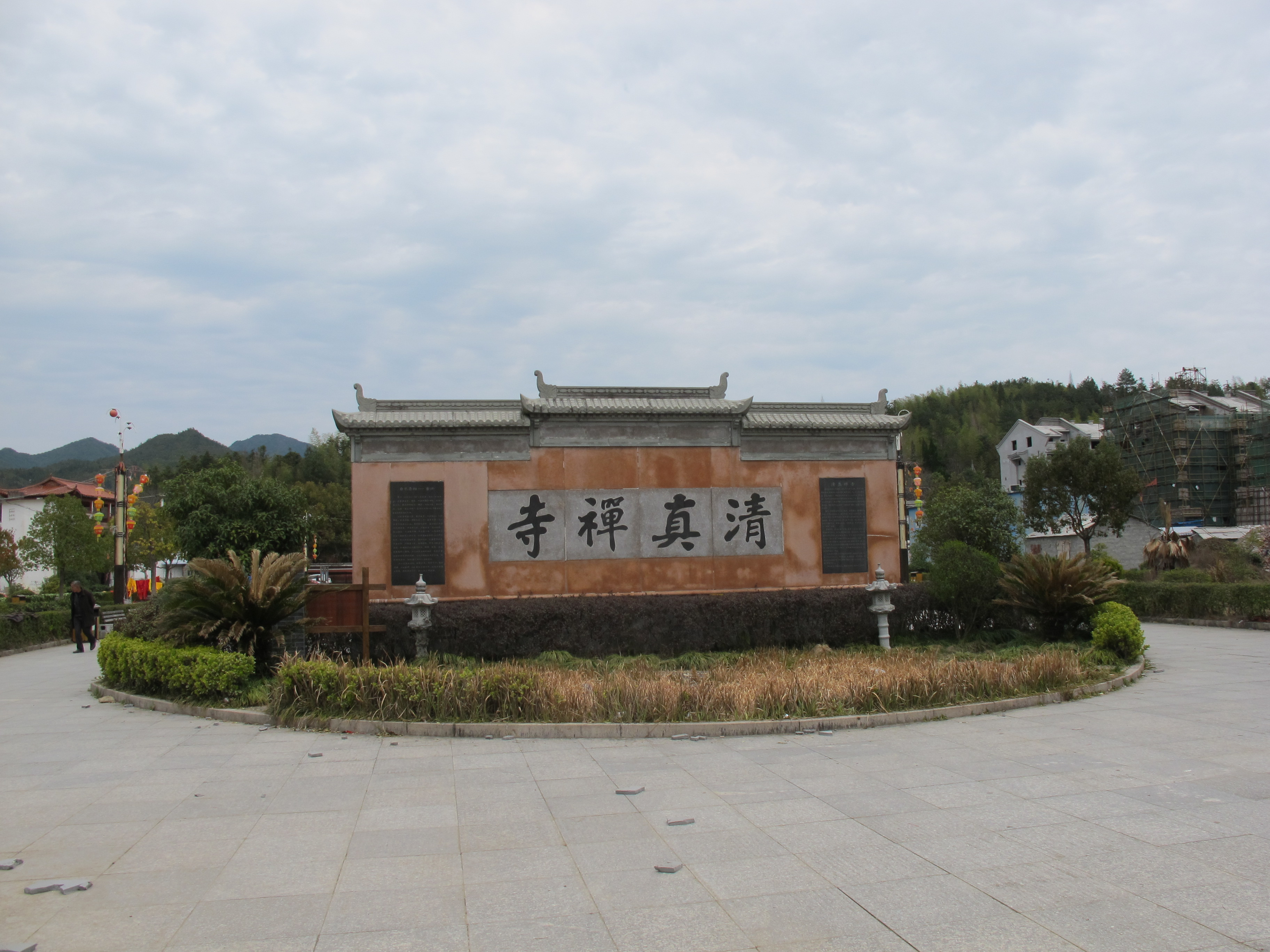
Spirit screen wall at Qingzhen Chan Temple

Upturned eaves and roof corners

Dragon-shaped roof ornament

Mural depicting a tiger in a mountain

Ceremonial candles inside the temple
