= Qingtian County =

County in Zhejiang, China

Qingtian 青田县 Chin1-dia2
- County
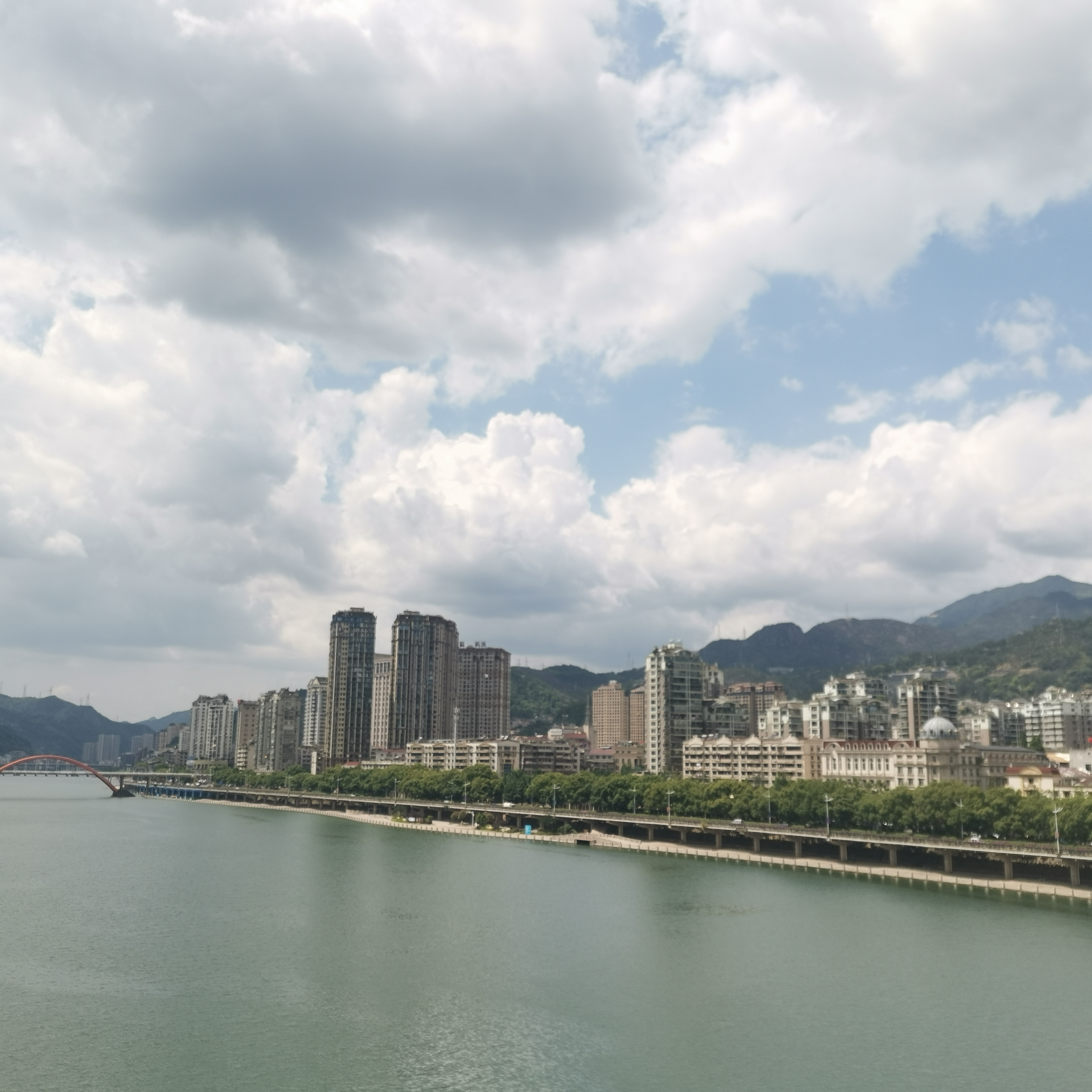
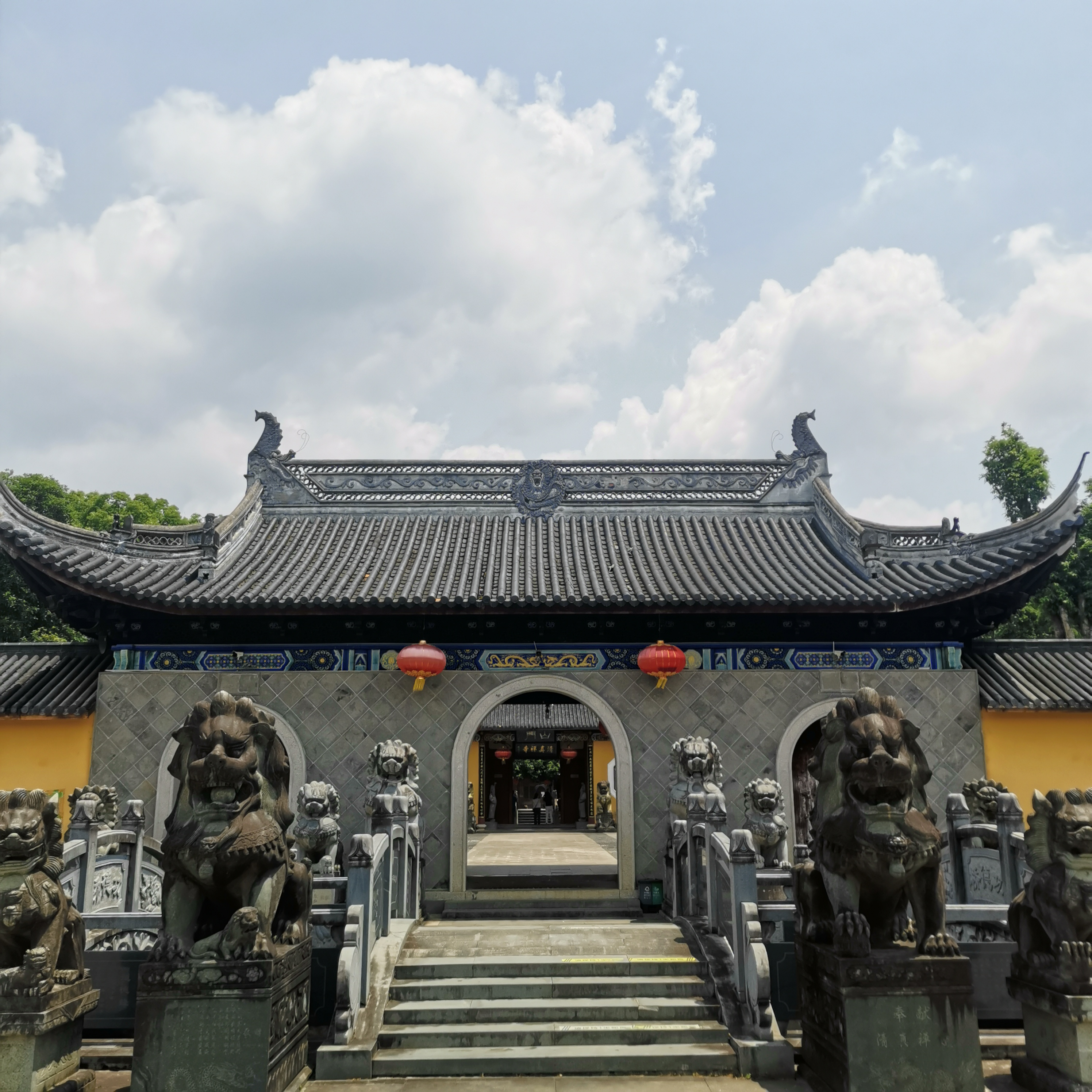
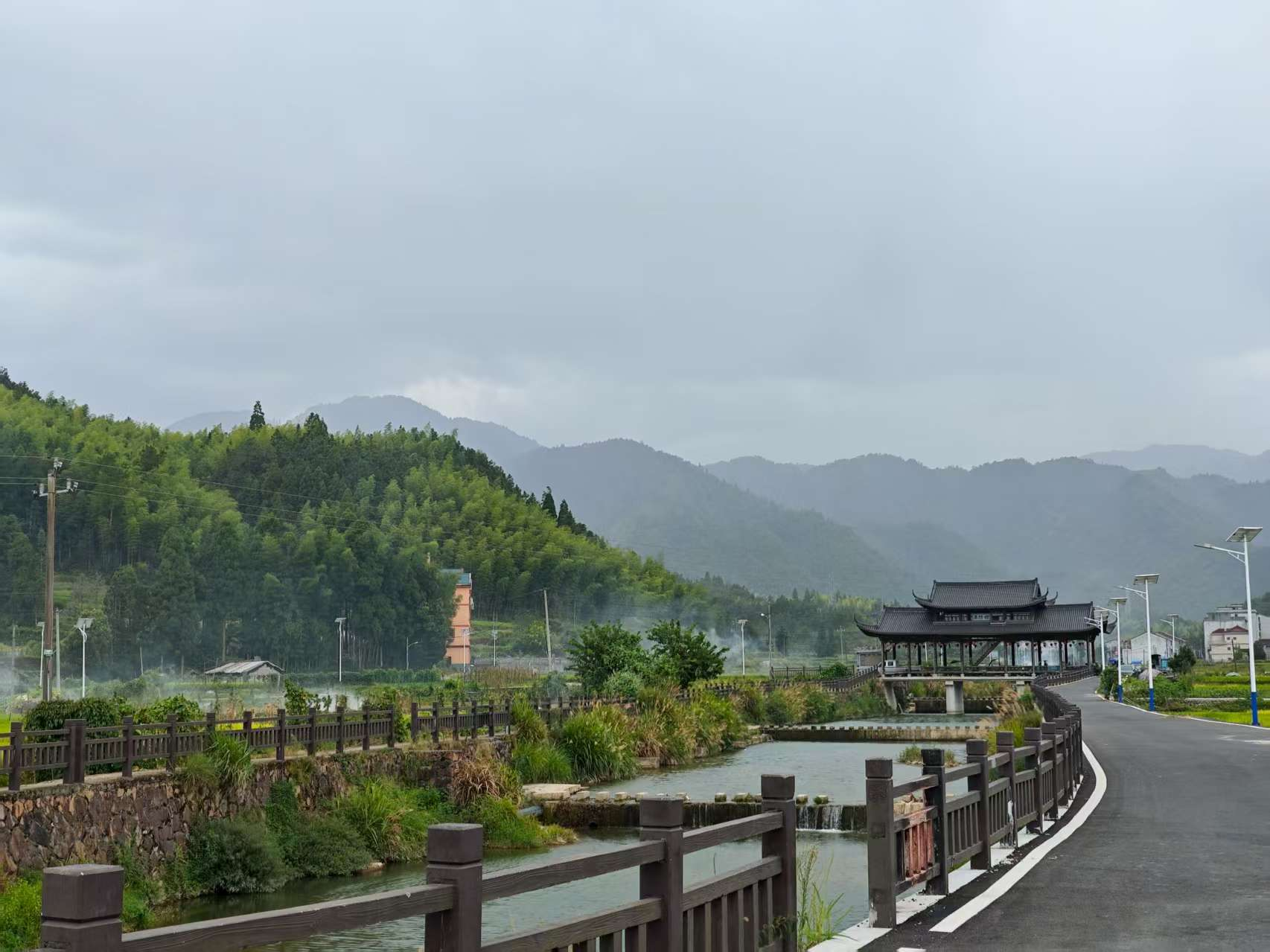
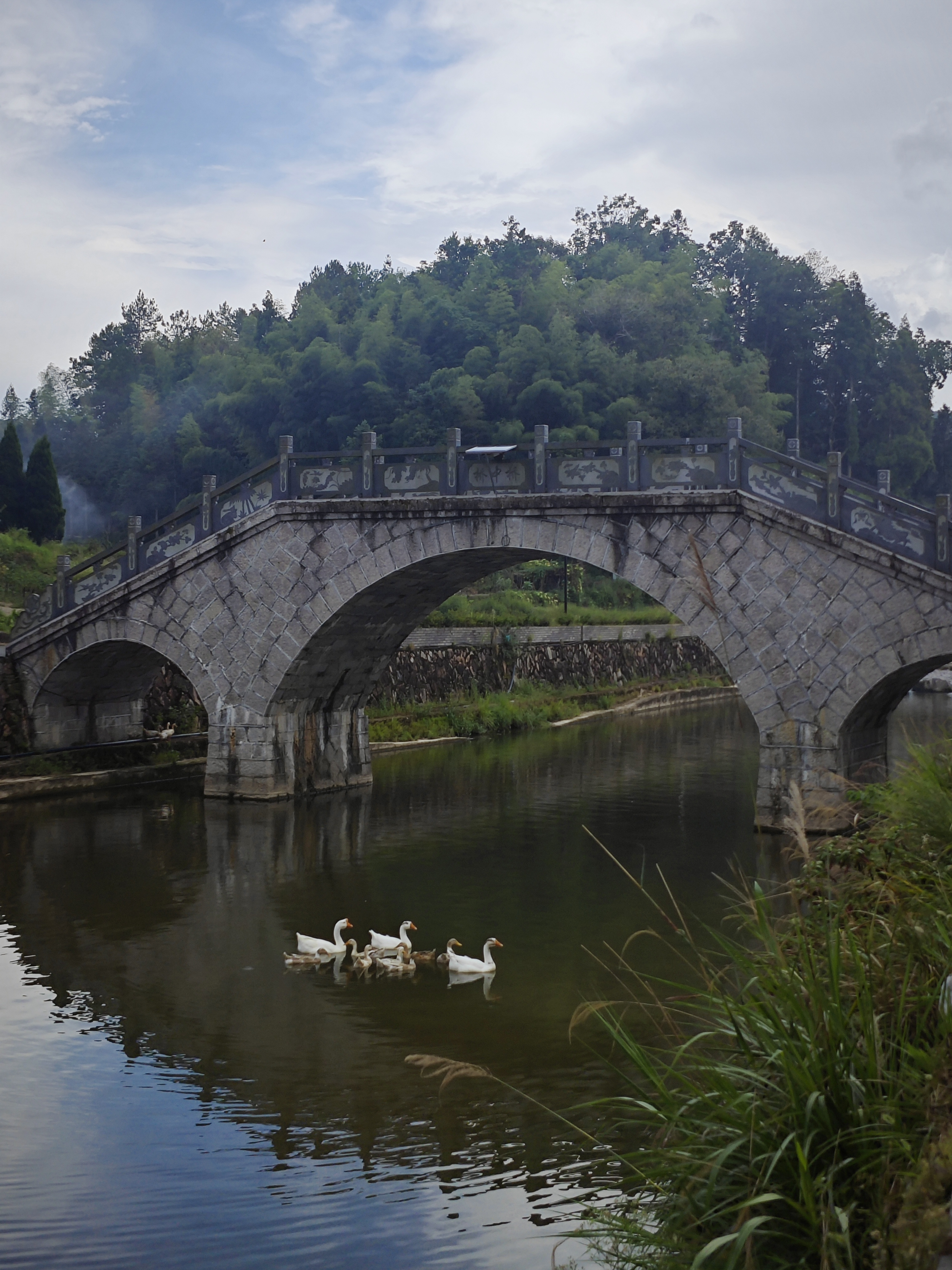
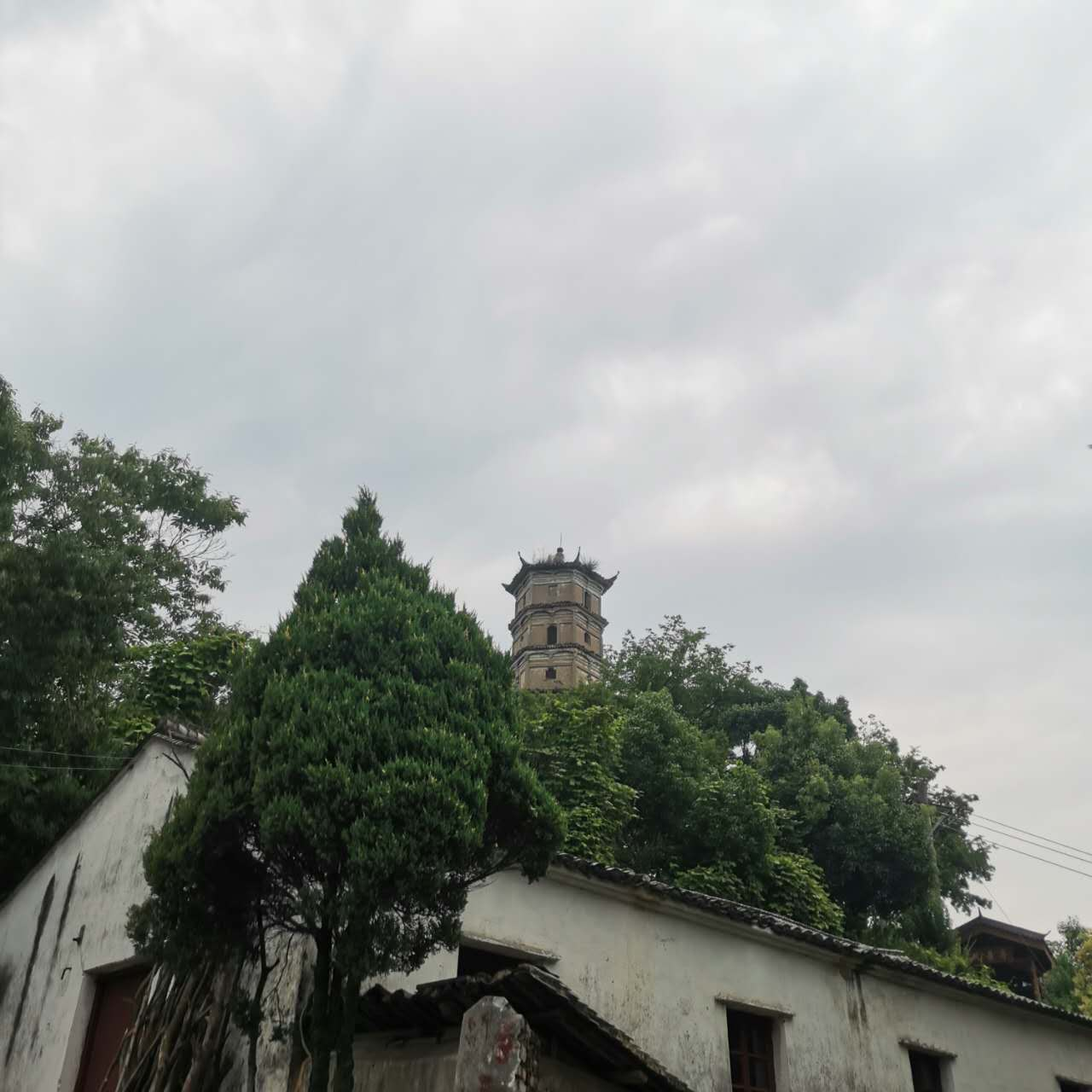
- Hecheng (seat of Qingtian) Qingzhen Chan Temple Wangfeitan Village Stone bridge in Fushan Township Tianyan pagoda
- Nickname: Little Europe (小欧洲)
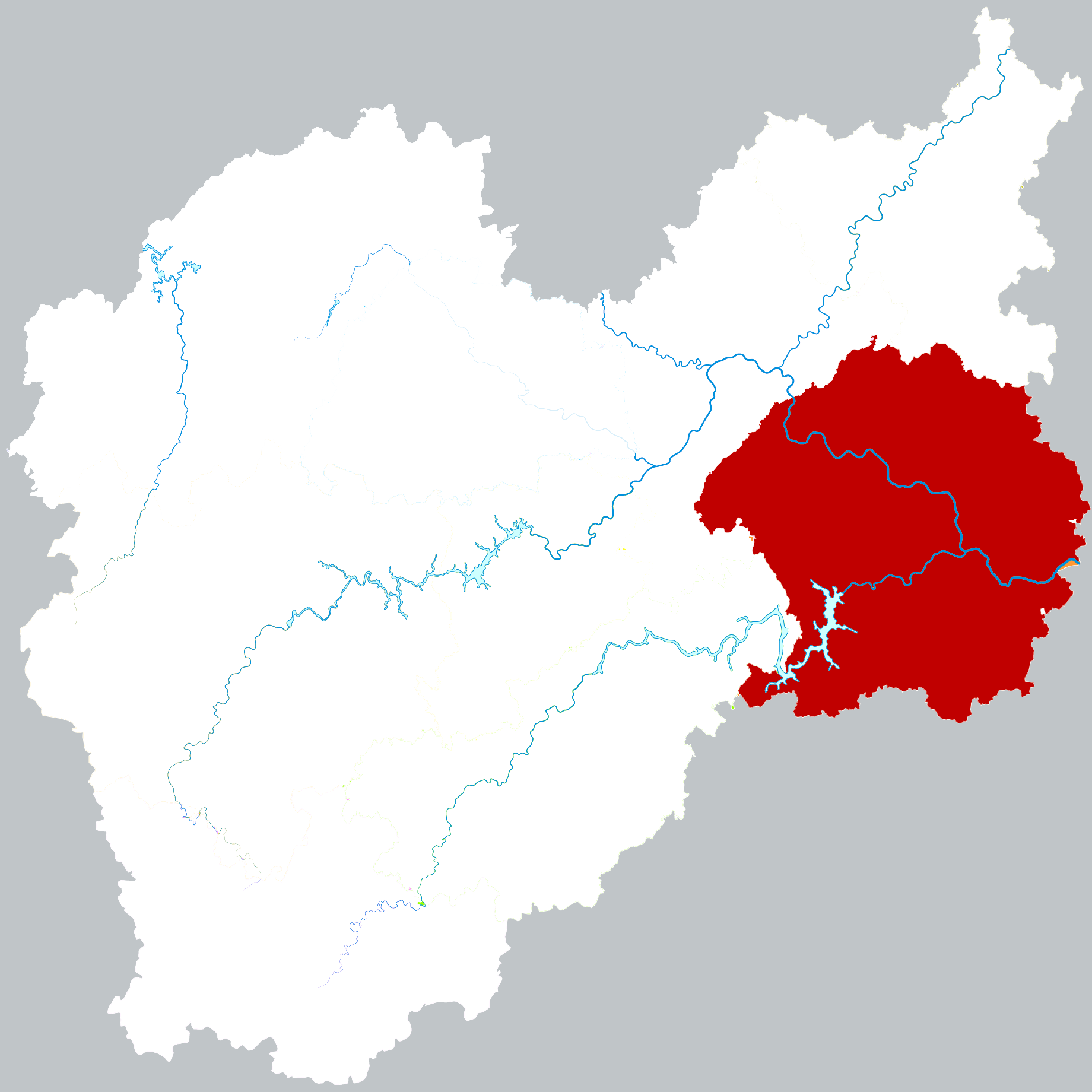
- Location of Qingtian County within Lishui

- Location of the seat in Zhejiang
- Country: People's Republic of China
- Province: Zhejiang
- Prefecture-level city: Lishui

Area
  - County: 2,493 km^{2} (963 sq mi)

Population (2022)
  - County: 568,800
  - Urban: 168,500
- Demonym: Qingtianese
- Time zone: UTC+8 (China Standard)
- Postal code: 323900
- Area code: 0578
- Website: https://www.qingtian.gov.cn/

Qingtian (Chinese: 青田; pinyin: Qīngtián; Wade–Giles: Ch'ing-t'ien; lit. 'azure field') is a county located in the southeastern part of Lishui, Zhejiang, China. It is split in two by the Ou River, which flows 388 kilometers before finally reaching the city of Wenzhou and emptying into the East China Sea. Situated in a hilly terrain with many ravines, the county's seat is Hecheng (鹤城, lit: 'the town of cranes'), also known as Qingtian City.

As one of China's best-known qiaoxiang (侨乡, lit: hometown of overseas Chinese), Qingtian is particularly famous for its diasporas, whose strong commercial networks and family ties have created highly visible diasporan communities across the globe, forming the bulk of Chinese populations in many European states, especially in Spain where they constitute over 80% of the entire Chinese community. It is also well known for its traditional stone carving industry, which has been widely acclaimed as "embroidery on stone" since the Northern and Southern dynasties.

== History ==
=== Early history ===
During the Spring and Autumn and Warring States periods, the area now known as Qingtian belonged to the Ouyue (甌越), then one of the ancient conglomeration of Baiyue tribes living across southern China. After the Empire of Qin unified the six kingdoms under its rule, it then conquered the tribes of Ouyue and Minyue (閩越), and established Minzhong Commandery (閩中郡) which included the present-day Qingtian county.

In May of the 3rd year of Emperor Hui of the Western Han Dynasty (1 BC), Zou Yao (騶搖), leader of the Ouyue tribe, was enfeoffed as the King of Donghai (東海王) for his meritorious service in assisting the Han Dynasty in destroying the Qin Dynasty. He established his capital in Dong'ou (東甌, present-day Wenzhou) and was known as the King of Dong'ou, and ruled over much of southern half of today's Zhejiang region.

=== Tang dynasty ===
The county of Qingtian was officially established in the 2nd year of Jingyun (景雲, 711) as a part of the Kuozhou prefecture (alias of present-day Lishui). The etymology of its name derives from a grass with bamboo-like leaves that can be turned into cyan-colored dyes, which is abundant in the paddy fields at the foot of the mountain in the county's northern corner.

=== Song dynasty ===
The Song represented a period of significant economic development and cultural prosperity in the county's history. During the Qingli era of the Northern Song Dynasty (慶曆, 1041–1048), a Confucian temple was built half a mile east of the county's government office for the veneration of Confucius. By the era of Chongning (崇寧, 1102–1106), the temple was expanded and the dormitories were built, and a county school was established to teach the "Six Arts" of rites, music, archery, charioteering, calligraphy, and mathematics.

Yuan era Longquan celadon Vase with "Ruyi" and "Daji" (Great Good Fortune) motifs, excavated from beneath the riverbed of the Ou river in Qingtian

In the 3rd year of Qingyuan, Southern Song (1197), in a major reconstruction project initiated by the local notable Zheng Ruxie (鄭汝諧), all the shabby thatched cottages in the county town were replaced with houses built of ceramic tiles, significantly improving the county's sanitary conditions whilst reducing the risk of fire.

=== Ming dynasty ===
In the early years of the Hongwu (洪武), Liu Bowen, the Imperial Censor and Grand Astrologer, returned to his hometown of Qingtian to investigate the local conditions. After finding out that the area had suffered from a three-year drought and was unable to pay its land taxes (田賦), he then decided to petition the court to reduce or exempt the taxes for the people of Qingtian. A few days later, Emperor Zhu Yuanzhang received Liu Bowen's memorial to the throne and read it aloud:

Qingtian, Qingtian, its lands are built on stacked stones. Its fields are without water, and its people without grain, so please halve the taxes, and halve it again...

At this moment, Liu Bowen hurriedly knelt down and kowtowed in gratitude. Zhu Yuanzhang suddenly realized that it was all a ruse by Liu Bowen. However, since a ruler's spoken word is law, the Emperor had no choice but to agree to reduce part of the land taxes for the county of Qingtian.

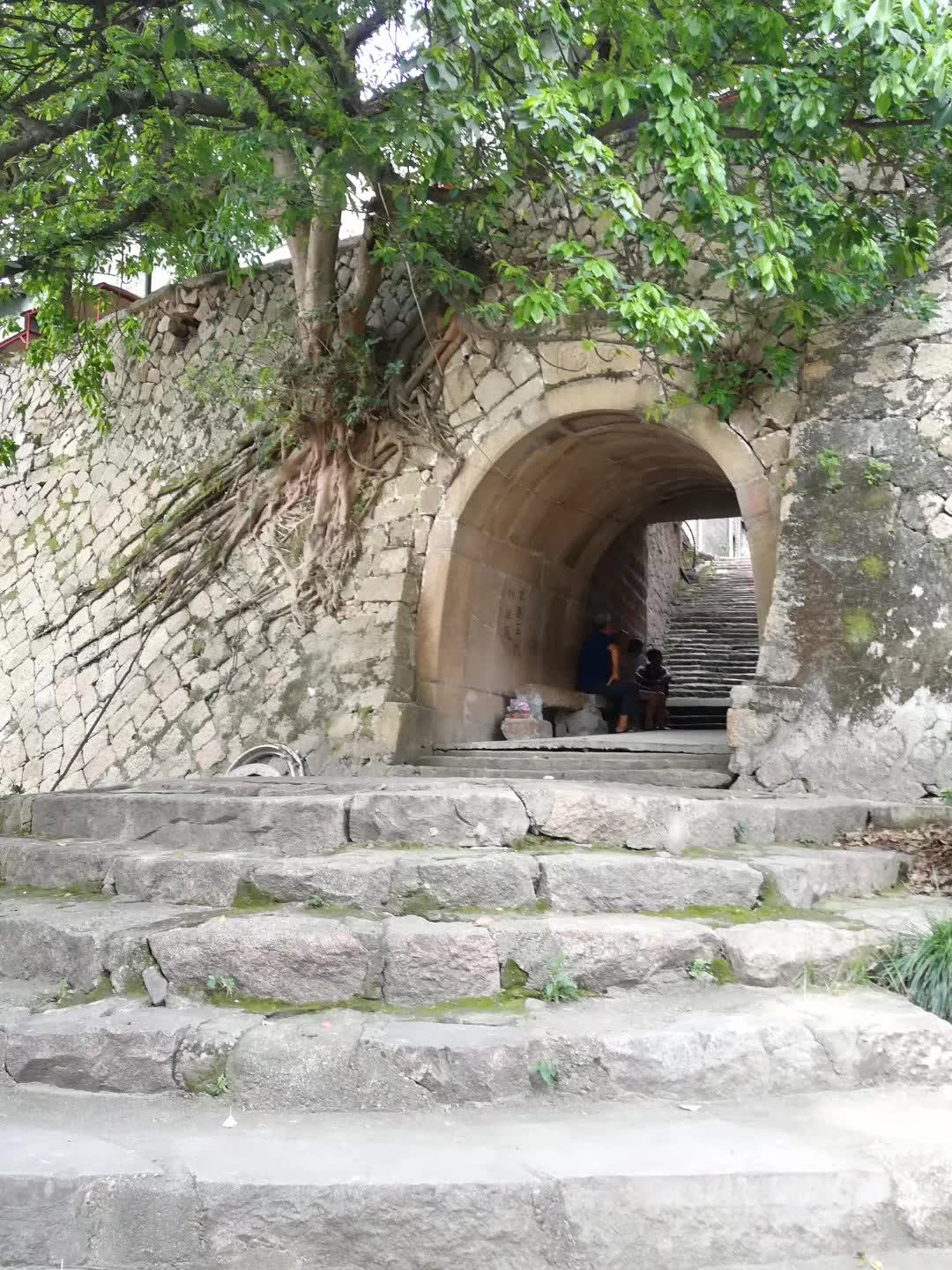
Xingchunmen - A Ming Dynasty city gate

In the 35th year of Emperor Jiajing of Ming (1556), due to the constant attacks by Wokous coming from the coastal areas, the county magistrate Li Kai (李楷) ordered the construction of a 3 kilometers long stone wall surrounding the town, the section of wall along the Ou River still remains today, and Qingtian is henceforth the only county in Lishui to have its own walled fortifications.

In April 1558, another assault on the town by Wokous was successfully repelled due to the protection by the wall.

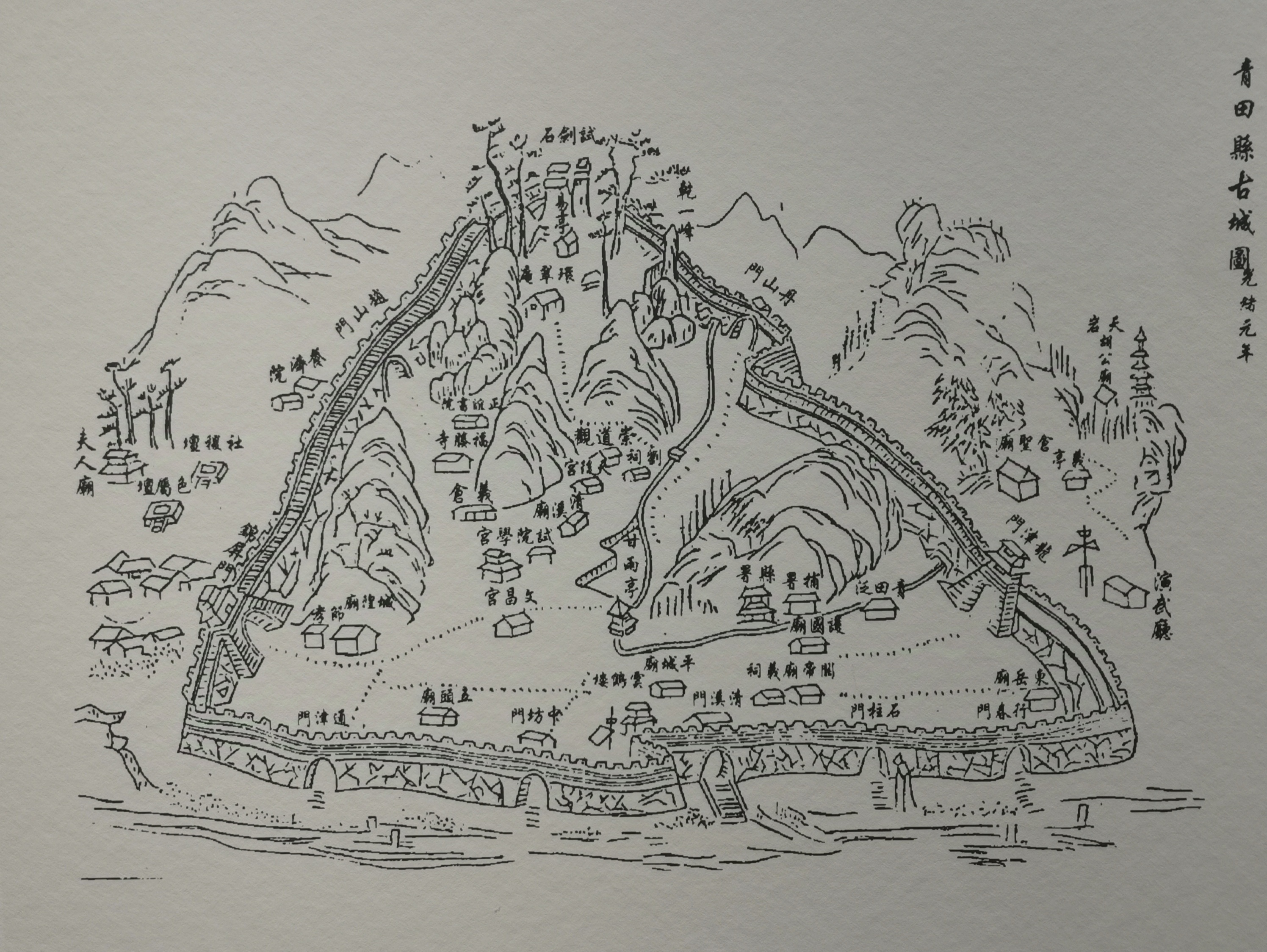
Illustration of the Ancient City of Qingtian as of 1875

=== Republic era ===
In the early years of the Republic of China, almost the entire county was devastated by the flood brought by a heavy rainstorm on August 29, 1912. Record says that the flood had affected as many as 16,133 households and destroyed 76,623 buildings, and merely around 5,000 people were left alive in Hecheng which had at once boasted more than 14,000 residents. Extreme hardship in the aftermath of the floods pushed many to emigrate abroad, which between 1912 and 1914, approximately a thousand people had left the county, and around two thousand Qingtianese were among the 140,000 Chinese Labour Corps that served on the Western Front, following China's entry into the World War I on the side of Entente Powers in 1917.

Owing to its scarce arable lands and its vibrant overseas communities with access to ideas and news from the Western world, Qingtian was the earliest region where the Chinese Communist Party (CCP) began its activities in southwestern Zhejiang.

The restoration of Nanking government since 1927 has brought a period of relative stability in Qingtian and the wider region, allowing certain construction projects to be initiated in this era. As part of Zhejiang's provincial road network, a gravel road with a total length of 124.08 km that ran from Lishui to Wenzhou via Qingtian was completed and opened to traffic in 1934.

This period of development came to an abrupt end with the outbreak of the Second Sino-Japanese War, when Qingtian and the wider southern Zhejiang suffered repeated attacks by Japanese forces. Throughout the war, the county was invaded three times by Japanese troops. These incursions caused 224 deaths, 181 injuries, the destruction of 5,158 houses, the seizure of 151,000 kilograms of grain, and the destruction or seizure of 347 civillian boats. The county was also subjected to eleven times of Japanese aerial bombing, with more than forty sorties and seventy-six bombs dropped, killing 38 people.

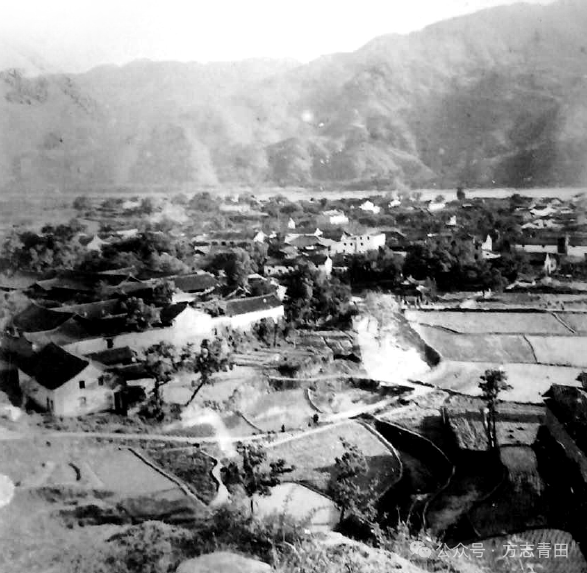
Town center of Qingtian, 1935

In 1948, to deal with the increasing Communist guerrilla activities and banditry in the climax of Chinese Civil War, Nantian township (南田鄉), also known as the birthplace of Liu Bowen, was separated from Qingtian and incorporated into the newly established county of Wencheng (文成縣); as a compensation, the town of Wenxi from the neighboring Yongjia county (永嘉縣) was added into Qingtian, giving the county access to its inland port facility.

Due to the influence of Chen Cheng, the First-Class General of the Republic of China Army and leading figure in KMT's party, government and military affairs, Qingtian had produced an unusually high number of National Revolutionary Army (NRA) generals in comparison to other counties. As the tide Second Chinese Civil War gradually shifted to the favour of CCP, over 3,300 people of Qingtianese descent, most of whom NRA military personnel with their families and associates, relocated to Taiwan together with the retreating nationalist government, forming an important element of Taiwan's Waishengren (外省人) community.

=== People's Republic era ===
The Nationalist rule in Qingtian officially ended with the arrival of the People's Liberation Army on May 13, 1949, and the People's Government of Qingtian was established on November 4th the same year.

Waves of intense political violence grappled Qingtian during the early phase of Cultural Revolution as part of the nationwide violent struggles.

With the start of China's Reform and Opening Up in 1979, Qingtian started to experience sustained economic growth as immigration to the developed Western countries and overseas remittances resumed. This in turn resulted in rapid urban and infrastructural development. Since the 1980s, the county's town center began to expand eastward and southward across the Ou River, incorporating numerous townships nearby .

Booming civilian-run manufacturing industries down in Wenzhou brought increasing flows of traffic, and placed the infrastructural capacity in Qingtian, then the most crucial thoroughfare for freight vehicles from Wenzhou, under heavy pressure. Comprehensive renovation of the National Highway 330 (G330) was completed in 1988, and the first ever bridge that spans across Ou River in Qingtian was officially opened to traffic in 1995, ending the history of townspeople's reliance on ferries to cross the river.

The Jinhua-Wenzhou railway that runs through Qingtian, as the first railway with investment from a joint venture, between Chinese state-owned enterprise and privately held companies in the infrastructural history of China was opened on June 11, 1998.

== Administrative divisions ==
The county of Qingtian is divided into 4 subdistricts, 10 towns, 18 townships, and 363 villages, with a total area of 2493 km^{2}.

=== Subdistricts (街道) ===
- Hecheng (鹤城街道)
- Ou'nan (瓯南街道: Ou1-nuo2)
- Youzhu (油竹街道: Yeu2-tieu7)
- Sanxikou (三溪口街道: Sa1-tshy1-khou3)

=== Towns (镇) ===
- Wenxi (温溪镇: Uo1-tsy1)
- Dongyuan (东源镇: Ton1-nuo2)
- Chuanliao (船寮镇)
- Beishan (北山镇: Peq7-sa1)
- Shankou (山口镇, Sa-khou3)
- Haikou (海口镇: Hae3-hkou3)
- Gaohu (高湖镇: Kau1-wuu2)
- Lakou (腊口镇: Laq8-khou3)
- Renzhuang (仁庄镇: Zan2-tso1)

=== Townships (乡) ===
- Zhangcun (章村乡: Cie1-tshuo1)
- Shuqiao (舒桥乡: Shiu1-jiuao2)
- Gui'ao (贵岙乡)
- Shixi (石溪乡: Tshy1-zyq8)
- Zhenbu (祯埠乡)
- Zhenwang (祯旺乡)
- Wanshan (万山乡: Ma6-sa1)
- Huangyang (黄垟乡)
- Jizhai (季宅乡: Dzeq8-ciu5)
- Haixi (海溪乡: Hae3-tshy1)
- Gaoshi (高市乡)
- Jupu (巨浦乡)
- Wanfu (万阜乡)
- Tangyang (汤垟乡)
- Fangshan (方山乡)
- Wukeng (吴坑乡)
- Rengong (仁宫乡)
- Zhangdan (章旦乡)
- Fushan (阜山乡)
- Linggen (岭根乡)
- Xiaozhoushan (小舟山乡)

== Demographics ==
=== Language ===
The majority of inhabitants speak Qingtianese (青田话, Chin1-dia2-wu6), whereas a small minority of residents in Wenxi speak Wenzhounese, both of which belong to the larger Wu language family.

=== Population ===
Year	Population
742	~36,000
1551	41,567
1776	89,667
1911	219,206
1942	271,073
1946	257,657
1949	227,800
2000	361,062
2010	336,542
2020	509,053

== Climate ==
Climate data for Qingtian, elevation 58 m (190 ft), (1991–2020 normals, extremes 1981–present)
Month	Jan	Feb	Mar	Apr	May	Jun	Jul	Aug	Sep	Oct	Nov	Dec	Year
Record high °C (°F)	26.7 (80.1)	30.6 (87.1)	32.5 (90.5)	35.3 (95.5)	39.3 (102.7)	39.4 (102.9)	42.7 (108.9)	40.6 (105.1)	40.1 (104.2)	36.7 (98.1)	31.7 (89.1)	26.4 (79.5)	42.7 (108.9)
Mean daily maximum °C (°F)	12.8 (55.0)	14.9 (58.8)	18.2 (64.8)	23.6 (74.5)	27.7 (81.9)	30.5 (86.9)	34.4 (93.9)	33.9 (93.0)	30.3 (86.5)	26.0 (78.8)	20.7 (69.3)	15.3 (59.5)	24.0 (75.2)
Daily mean °C (°F)	8.3 (46.9)	9.9 (49.8)	13.0 (55.4)	18.1 (64.6)	22.5 (72.5)	25.7 (78.3)	29.0 (84.2)	28.6 (83.5)	25.6 (78.1)	20.9 (69.6)	15.8 (60.4)	10.3 (50.5)	19.0 (66.2)
Mean daily minimum °C (°F)	5.3 (41.5)	6.6 (43.9)	9.6 (49.3)	14.3 (57.7)	19.0 (66.2)	22.6 (72.7)	25.4 (77.7)	25.2 (77.4)	22.3 (72.1)	17.3 (63.1)	12.5 (54.5)	6.9 (44.4)	15.6 (60.0)
Record low °C (°F)	−3.7 (25.3)	−3.7 (25.3)	−2.7 (27.1)	3.4 (38.1)	7.7 (45.9)	13.3 (55.9)	19.1 (66.4)	19.9 (67.8)	14.1 (57.4)	6.5 (43.7)	0.6 (33.1)	−4.1 (24.6)	−4.1 (24.6)
Average precipitation mm (inches)	56.9 (2.24)	76.2 (3.00)	142.5 (5.61)	142.4 (5.61)	167.7 (6.60)	283.7 (11.17)	207.2 (8.16)	266.4 (10.49)	185.8 (7.31)	81.6 (3.21)	65.8 (2.59)	53.6 (2.11)	1,729.8 (68.1)
Average precipitation days (≥ 0.1 mm)	11.8	12.4	16.6	16.2	17.0	19.0	14.5	16.5	12.9	7.9	9.9	9.3	164
Average snowy days	1.5	1.4	0.2	0	0	0	0	0	0	0	0	0.6	3.7
Average relative humidity (%)	71	73	74	74	76	80	76	76	75	71	74	70	74
Mean monthly sunshine hours	97.2	97.1	107.4	128.7	132.7	116.8	203.4	189.5	152.3	156.7	115.1	118.6	1,615.5
Percentage possible sunshine	30	31	29	33	32	28	48	47	42	44	36	37	36
Source: China Meteorological Administrationall-time extreme temperatureall-time May low

== Transportation ==
=== Highway ===
By the end of 2023, the total highway mileage in Qingtian County reached 2,406.35 km, reflecting continued expansion of its road network. Of this total, 67.3 km were expressways, with the remaining 145.7 kilometers of secondary roads, 16.8 kilometers of tertiary roads, and 1,442.2 kilometers of quasi-fourth-class roads serving both urban and rural areas.

In 2013, the social passenger volume was 11.3 million, the freight volume was 4.53 million tons, the freight turnover was 717.49 million tons-kilometers, and the passenger turnover was 356.43 million person-kilometers. National Highway 330 traverses the county, linking Qingtian with the broader provincial highway system.

=== Railway ===
Qingtian is served by the Jinhua–Wenzhou railway, a key east–west corridor in southern Zhejiang that links the county with major transport hubs such as Lishui, Jinhua, and Wenzhou, and connects onward to China's wider national rail system. Besides the conventional rail, Qingtian has also been connected to China's high-speed rail network late-2015 via the Jinhua-Wenzhou high-speed railway, which runs through the county.

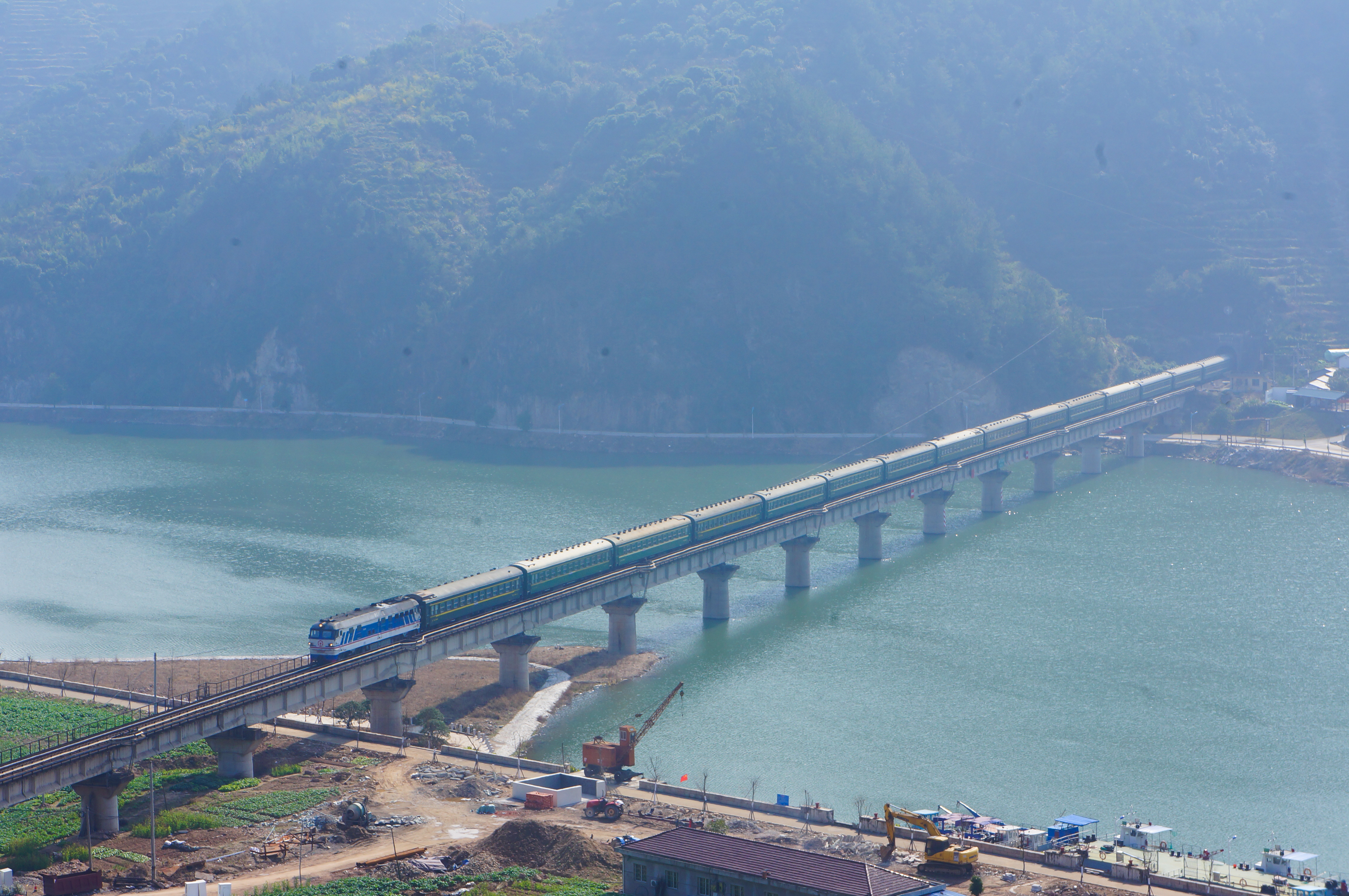
A train passes Lishui Daxi River Bridge.

A CRH380B "Hexie" high-speed train entering Qingtian Railway Station

=== Waterway ===
The Port of Wenxi is the only port in Lishui prefecture that has direct access to the outer sea, with an annual cargo throughput of more than 1.4 million tons. Cargo ships departing from the Port of Wenxi can directly reach major ports in mainland China, Hong Kong and Macau.

== Culture ==
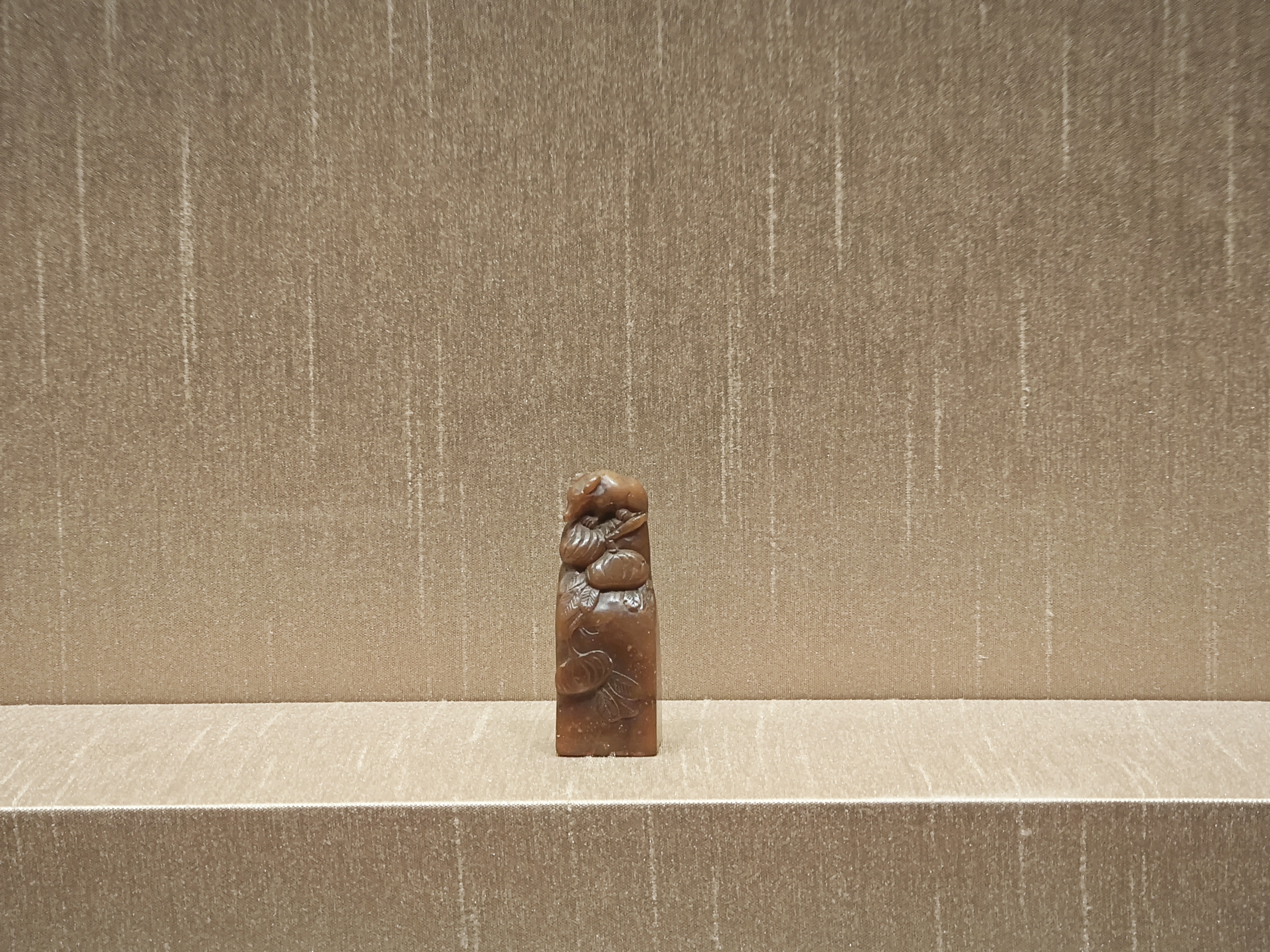
Dark reddish-brown square Qingtian soapstone seal from the Qing era—a collection of Suzhou Museum

=== Stone carving ===
Qingtian stone (青田石), a silicate rock unique to the mountains of Qingtian, is widely considered as one of China's four most exquisite stones for arts of sculpture and carving, together with stones of Balin (巴林), Shoushan (寿山), and Changhua (昌化). The seals carved out of Qingtian stone are among the list of China's traditional "Four Great Seal Stones" (四大印章).

=== Dia'ngai ===
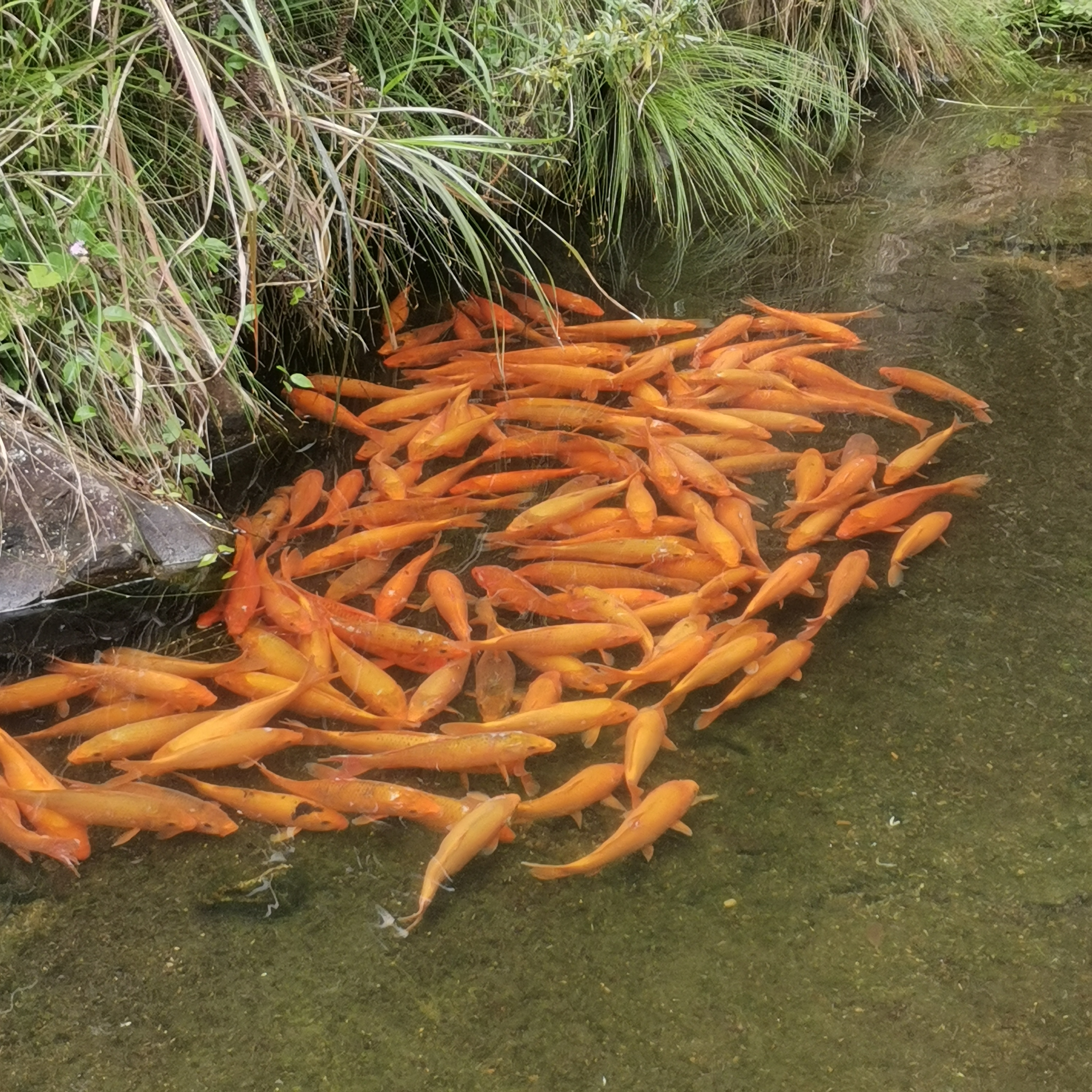
A pond of dia'ngai, in Fangshan, Qingtian

Cprinus carpio var, commonly known as dia'ngai (田鱼) in Qingtianese dialect, is a local aquaculture species in the Ou River basin. Historical records show that the pisciculture of dia'ngai in Qingtian could be traced back over two millennia ago. Dia'ngai is an essential delicacy for every family in Qingtian during festive seasons, and air-dried dia'ngai together with Longquan celadon and swords have been tribute items to the imperial court since the Southern Song dynasty.

== Notable people ==
- Chen Cheng, National Revolutionary Army commander, Vice President and Premier of Taiwan
- Liu Bowen, Ming Dynasty military strategist, Politician, philosopher
- Chen Li-an, electrical engineer, mathematician and Taiwanese politician
- Chen Qi, politician, diplomat, and head of the Chinese delegation to the 1915 Panama-Pacific International Exposition
- Chen Muhua, Communist revolutionary and People's Republic of China politician
- Xia Chao, civil governor of Zhejiang 1924–1926
- Zhang Naiqi, People's Republic of China politician

== See also ==
- Qingtian dialect
