= Chen Qi (1878) =

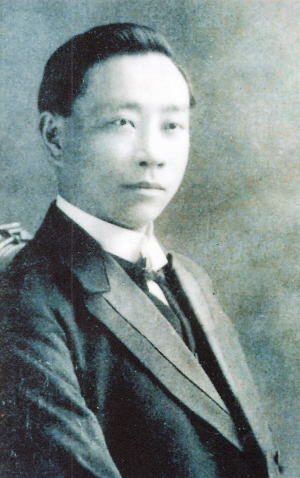

Director of the Panama-Pacific International Exposition Secretariat
- In office February 1915 – November 1915

Vice Speaker of the Zhejiang Provincial Assembly
- In office 1922–1924

Director of the Sichuan Provincial Police Department
- In office 1924–1924

Personal details
- Born: 1878 Wangfeitan village, Qingtian county, Zhejiang province, Qing Empire
- Died: 1925 (aged 46–47) Jiujiang city, Jiangxi province, Republic of China
- Cause of death: Pulmonary disease
- Resting place: Shanghai, Republic of China

Military service
- Allegiance: Hunan Military Academy Northeast Inspectorate
- Rank: Supervisor Lieutenant general staff officer

Chen Qi (traditional Chinese: 陳琪; simplified Chinese: 陈琪; pinyin: Chén qí; Wade-Giles: Ch'en Ch'i; Wugniu (Qingtian dialect): dzan2-dzy6; 1878-1925), courtesy name Lanxun (兰薰), was a political, military, and diplomatic figure whose career traversed both the Qing dynasty and the Republic of China.

As a native of Qingtian County, Zhejiang Province, he was widely hailed as the "pioneer of Chinese exhibitions" for his skills in diplomacy and curation.

== Early Years ==
Chen Qi's ancestors originally descended from Longwan in neighboring Wenzhou, who migrated to Fushan, Qingtian during the Kangxi period in early 18 century. Chen Qi's father, Chen Bangjun, was one of the wealthiest man in Fushan and had four children, of whom Chen Qi was the eldest, whereas Chen Qi's mother, Xiang, came from a prominent family in Qingtian.

In 1899, during the 25th year of the Guangxu Emperor's reign, Chen Qi was enrolled in the Jiangnan Military Academy (江南陆师学堂). In 1903, he served as the supervisor and instructor of the Hunan Military Academy (湖南武备学堂) and was went to Japan to study military affairs.

== Career Overseas ==
In 1904, Chen Qi was sent to the United States to participate in the Louisiana Purchase Exposition, where he was charged with the task for exhibiting Chinese craftswares like Hunan embroidery, Qingtian stone carvings, and other competition items. The Chinese delegation ended up winning the most medals in the end. On his journey to the US, Chen Qi also visited Britain, France, Russia, Germany, Italy, Portugal, Switzerland, the Ottoman Empire, Cyprus (then under British colonial administration), and other countries to investigate local politics, religion, industry, commerce, agriculture, mining, and customs.

Based on what he saw and experienced during the tour, Chen wrote down several number of works, including "Travelogue of the St. Louis Exposition in the New World" (新大陆圣路易斯博览会游记), "Global Diary" (环球日记), and "Travelogue" (漫游纪实).

In 1905, he was appointed as a counselor and accompanied Dai Hongci, Duanfang and other top-Qing ministers to examine the political systems of Europe, America, and Japan. In the same year, he was transferred to Jiangsu to be in charge of the teaching department of the Liangjiang Military Training Office (两江督练公所教导处) and the Nanyang Industrial Exposition (南洋劝业会).

After 1911, Chen Qi was transferred to the Northeast Inspectorate (东北巡阅使署) as a lieutenant general staff officer, and concurrently served as the Director of Fengtian Foreign Affairs Office （奉天对外交涉司), and Fengtian Industrial Promotion Commissioner (奉天劝业道).

After a major famine occurred in Liaodong, the authorities planned to allocate 30,000 taels of silver for relief, but was persuaded by Chen Qi to increase the sum to 100,000 taels of silver, and use part of that fund to establish an Agricultural Bank, which would then issue 200,000 taels of silver in paper money to disaster victims to help them resume their livelihood. Later, at the request of scholars and merchants, Chen Qi convened industrialists from the three northeastern provinces to raise additional funds, raising a total of one million taels of silver, and renamed it the Fengtian Industrial Bank (奉天兴业银行).

== Mission to San Francisco ==
In 1912, with the Panama Canal nearing completion, US President William Howard Taft announced that the United States would hold the Panama-Pacific International Exposition in San Francisco in February 1915 and extended invitations to countries around the world. Subsequently, the US sent representatives to China to lobby for the event, and in October 1912, the Peking government held a groundbreaking ceremony for the Chinese pavilion in San Francisco. Even so, China did not undertake any substantial preparations. It was not until May 1913 when the US government formally recognized Yuan Shikai's government, becoming one of the first Western powers to do so, that motivated Yuan to participate in the Exposition.

In June 1913, the "Bureau for the Preparation of the Panama-Pacific International Exposition" (筹备巴拿马赛会事务局) was established, and at the bureau's founding ceremony, Minister of Industry and Commerce Liu Kuiyi (刘揆一) stated:

"This bureau was established just after the United States formally recognized the Republic of China. When China goes to the Panama-Pacific International Exposition, it will be the day our new five-colored national flag crosses the Pacific Ocean to compete with the world. This is truly the best opportunity since the founding the Republic to join an international club." "The United States was the first to recognize our Republic; on this grand occasion, our country should participate and show particular solemnity, as this is the way to foster good diplomatic relations."

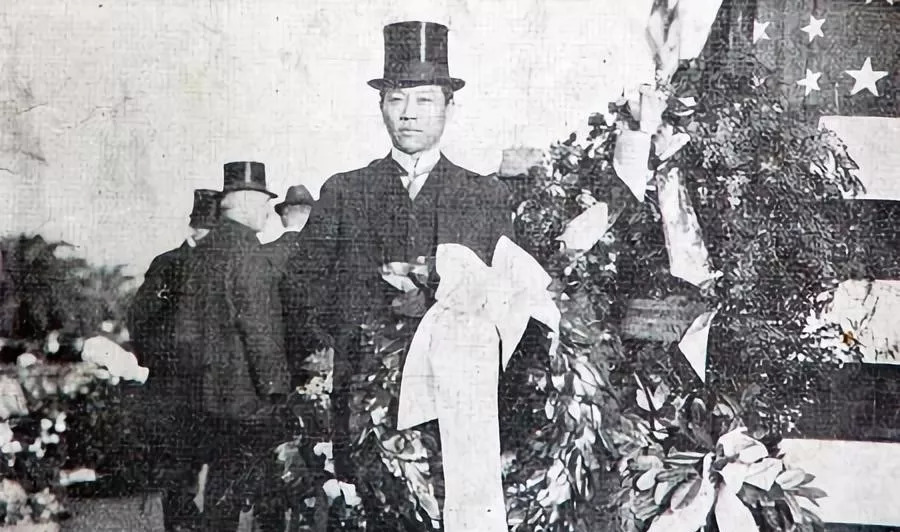
Chen Qi as head of the Chinese delegation at the 1915 Panama-Pacific International Exposition.

In June 1913, Chen Qi was personally appointed by President Yuan Shikai as the supervisor and director of the preparatory office of the Chinese delegation to the Panama-Pacific International Exposition. China's entries included more than 100,000 products from 19 provinces, winning more than 1,200 medals, honorary awards, gold medals, silver medals, bronze medals, and commendations. China ranked first among all countries in terms of both the number of entries and the number of awards.

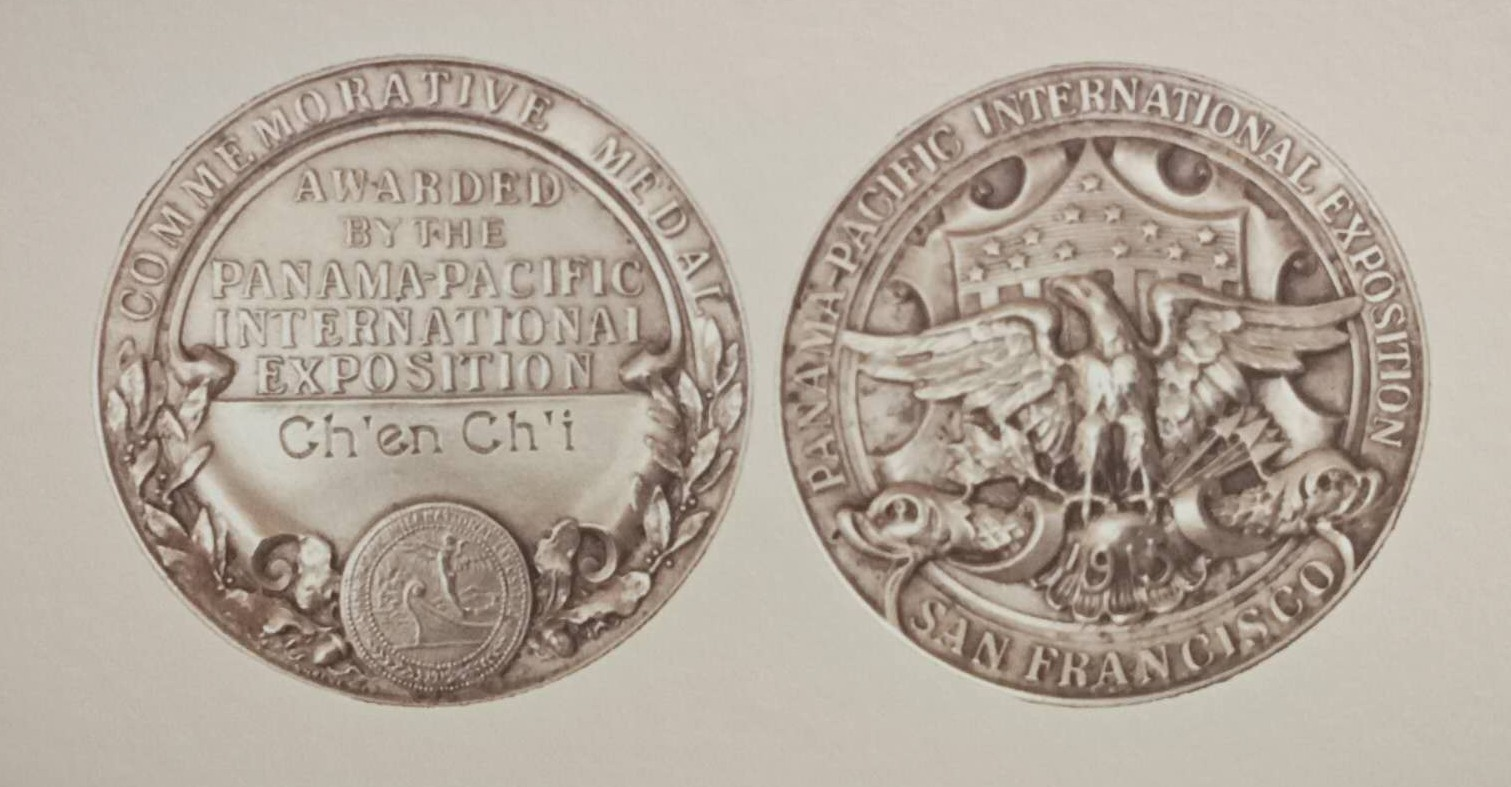
A Panama-Pacific International Exposition medal bearing the name of Ch'en Ch'i (in Wade-Giles), 1915.

From his appointment in 1913 until his return to Shanghai from San Francisco in June 1916, Chen Qi's mission lasted for 3 years, and in reflection of their performance at the Exposition, Chen Qi wrote a book titled "A Record of China's Participation in the Panama-Pacific International Exposition" (中国参与巴拿马太平洋博览会记实).

== Death ==
In 1922, Chen Qi was elected as the vice-chairman of the Zhejiang Provincial Assembly (浙江省议会). In the winter of 1924, Chen Qi became the director of the Sichuan Provincial Police Department (四川省警政厅), but was forced to leave office due to his increasingly serious lung disease.

On his way back home, Chen Qi died in 1925 while passing through Jiujiang, Jiangxi province. He was buried in Lanpu Garden (兰圃) next to Zhoujiaqiao Residence in Shanghai.
