= Xia Chao =

- 夏超
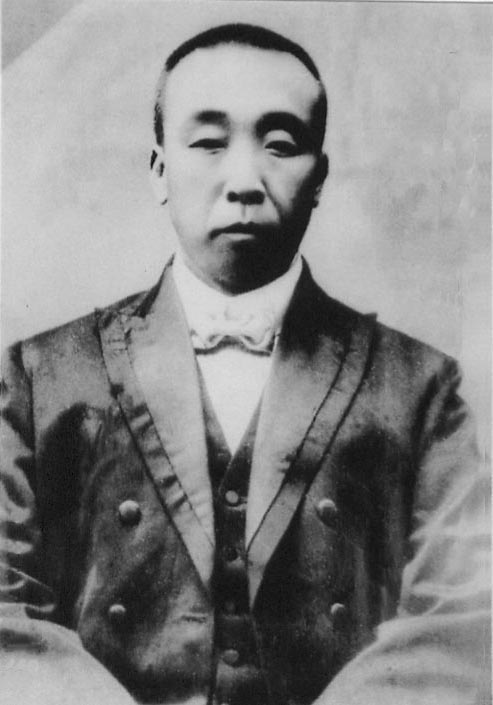

Civil governor of Zhejiang Province
- In office 1924–1926 Serving with Sun Chuanfang and Lu Xiangting (de facto military governors)
- Deputy: Liao Xunpu (as top secretary)
- Preceded by: Zhang Zaiyang
- Succeeded by: Chen Yi

Police chief of Zhejiang
- In office c. 1910s – c. 1920s

Personal details
- Born: 1881 or 1882 Qingtian, Zhejiang, Qing China
- Died: 1926 Zhejiang, Republic of China
- Cause of death: Execution
- Party: Tongmenghui (c. 1911); Wubei Clique (c. 1910s); Zhili clique (1924–26); Kuomintang (1926)
- Occupation: Military officer, policeman

Military service
- Allegiance: Republic of China
- Branch/service: Zhejiang's provincial army (?–1926); National Revolutionary Army (NRA) (1926)
- Years of service: ?–1926
- Commands: 18th Corps (NRA)
- Battles/wars: Xinhai Revolution; National Protection War; Warlord Era; Northern Expedition (executed)

Xia Chao (Chinese: 夏超; Wade–Giles: Hsia Ch'ao; 1882–1926) was the long-time police chief of Zhejiang Province during the Chinese Warlord Era (1916–1928), and also served as the province's civil governor from 1924 to 1926. He was among the most powerful political figures in Zhejiang throughout much of his career. In order to maintain and expand his influence over the province, Xia opportunistically played out different Chinese warlord factions against each other. Plotting to gain Zhejiang's independence from the warlord regime of Sun Chuanfang, Xia launched a rebellion in 1926, but was captured and summarily executed.

== Biography ==
=== Early life ===
Born at Qingtian County, Zhejiang, in 1881 or 1882, Xia joined the Tongmenghui and took part in the Xinhai Revolution against the Qing dynasty in 1911. Along with his fellow revolutionary Gu Naibin, he planned to burn down the manor of Qing Minister of Communications Sheng Xuanhuai. At some point, Xia joined Zhejiang's provincial military, trained in Japan, and eventually graduated from the Zhejiang Military Academy in Hangzhou. He subsequently joined several officer associations, namely the Wubei Clique, the Kung-huo Tang, and the "Ten Brothers". Membership in these associations helped him to garner influence and allies in Zhejiang.

=== Police chief of Zhejiang ===
Zhejiang (red) in the Republic of China

By the time China's first president Yuan Shikai declared himself emperor in 1916, Xia had risen to chief of the provincial and metropolitan police in Zhejiang. Many military and civilian leaders around China were opposed to Yuan's monarchism, resulting in rebellions against the Chinese government that culminated in the National Protection War. Xia sympathized with the republicans, and consequently started to conspire with Tong Baoxuan, commander of the Zhejiang New Army's 2nd Battalion, to overthrow Zhejiang's pro-Yuan provincial government. The two plotted to capture and murder Zhejiang's governor Zhu Rui, but the governor fled on 11 April 1916 before they could carry out their plan. Shortly thereafter, Yuan Shikai died, resulting in the collapse of the monarchist movement. With the end of Yuan's regime, Lu Gongwang was appointed as new military governor of Zhejiang, while Shen Dingyi became president of the province's provincial assembly.

Thereafter, however, Zhejiang descended into civil strife between the Wubei Clique led by Xia and a rival association, the Baoding Clique led by governor Lu. As governor, Lu initially had the upper hand in the power struggle, and started to undermine Xia by abolishing the provincial police. Alienating many leading Zhejiang officials through his high-handed policies, Lu finally drove Xia into open opposition when the latter learned that he was supposed to be replaced as metropolitan police chief by Lu's follower Fu Qiyong. It is likely that Xia was extremely opposed to Fu's accession not just because he wanted to maintain his power, but also due to his fear that his misappropriation of funds could be uncovered. By fall 1916, Xia plotted with his fellow officer and "Ten Brothers" associate, Zhou Fengqi, to overthrow Lu. In case of success, the two planned to share power, with Zhou becoming military and Xia civil governor.

Lu learned of the conspiracy, however, and ordered the police chief removed from power. When Fu Qiyong was supposed to be appointed as the next chief on 26 December, Xia's followers struck by seizing and publicly beating Fu during his inauguration. The other policemen did not intervene, leaving Fu humiliated and in no position to succeed Xia. Meanwhile, Hangzhou's police went on strike in support of their old chief, while Xia himself took "many" chests of money (possibly embezzled funds) from the police headquarters to the local Bank of China. He also ordered the regional newspapers to censor their reports, and tried to bribe Fu and Lu into accepting their deposition. Lu refused, however, and the tensions quickly increased. Neither Lu nor Xia were ready to back down and their followers prepared for open civil war. Though the intervention of assembly president Shen Dingyi prevented bloodshed, the deteriorating political situation in Zhejiang caused the new central government in Beijing to appoint Yang Shande as military governor. Though the officials in the province widely condemned the appointment of a non-native such as Yang as governor, they could not prevent his military-backed accession in January 1917.

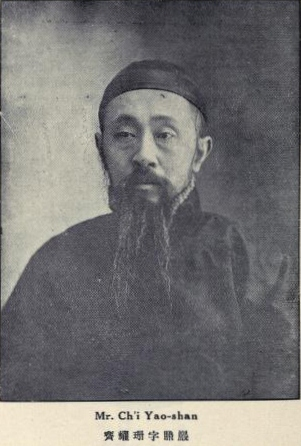
Xia became the protégé of Qi Yaoshan (pictured) from 1917

Xia tried to come to good terms with the new provincial government which in turn attempted to reach an understanding with local officials. He won the attention of military governor Yang by having his wife visiting Yang's wife, and also managed to become the protégé of Qi Yaoshan, the new civil governor. In contrast, his rival Lu left the province and joined the Kuomintang in Guangdong. In the following decade, Zhejiang came to be dominated by the Anhui clique while China was divided among hostile warlords during the so-called Warlord Era. Throughout this time, Xia continued to serve as police chief. After Yang died in 1919, he sided with the Anhui clique against his local rivals, and helped to establish Anhui associate Lu Yongxiang as the new military governor of Zhejiang. By backing Yang and Lu, Xia did not just maintain his own power, but also managed to make himself irreplaceable as middleman between the military governors and the provincial natives. He also became an important figure in the Jin-Qu-Yu-Chu association (JQYC), a lobby group for the interests of Jinhua, Quzhou, Yanzhou, and Chuzhou.

=== Civil governor under Sun Chuanfang ===
In 1924, Xia and other Zhejiang officials cooperated with Zhili clique leaders Wu Peifu and Sun Chuanfang to overthrow Lu. They probably believed that the Zhili clique would have a weaker grip on the province than the Anhui clique, thereby strengthening their own position. Sun appointed Xia civil governor of Zhejiang for his cooperation in the takeover. When a Kuomintang-sympathetic rebellion erupted in Ningbo in September 1924 against Xia and his allies, Sun helped them to suppress it. In turn, the Zhejiang officials aided Sun in repelling an invasion by the Anhui clique and its new ally, the Fengtian clique, in 1925. Nevertheless, the warlord had grown wary of the local officials' power, and used this conflict to keep them in check. Xia was required to act as Sun's vice-commander during the fighting, removing him from his power base, while the warlord placed a garrison loyal to himself in Hangzhou.

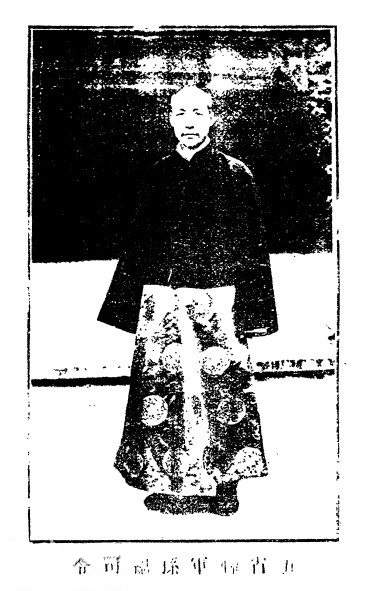
Sun Chuanfang, Xia's superior from 1924

Unhappy with this development, Xia and the local gentry rallied against Sun, declared their province's autonomy and adopted a new constitution. Sun answered by sending his subordinate Lu Xiangting to Hangzhou on 25 January 1926, appointing him as Zhejiang's "military commander-in-chief" (de facto military governor), and positioning his army at routes into the province. The secession was thus quelled before it could start. Knowing that further resistance was futile, Xia made a political turnaround. He welcomed Lu upon his arrival, threw an "impressive" party for him, and even declared an official holiday in his honor, ensuring that the newly appointed military commander-in-chief accepted Xia's submission and kept him in his position. Despite this, Xia continued to plot against Sun, knowing that the warlord's rule was widely resented in Zhejiang. As result, Xia started to build up police and security forces for a rebellion; his private army grew to at least 5,000 by 1925.

The opportunity for an uprising came in late 1926. Poor harvests in 1925–26 had resulted in an economic crisis in Zhejiang which was exacerbated by Sun's taxes, so that the province's population was restive. Furthermore, the Kuomintang's National Revolutionary Army (NRA) under Zhejiang native Chiang Kai-shek had launched the Northern Expedition to reunify China. After the NRA invaded Sun's territories, Xia was contacted by Kuomintang officials from Zhejiang. Secret negotiations began, which resulted in Xia reaching an agreement with Chiang Kai-shek. The civil governor promised to defect if the NRA managed to defeat Wu Peifu at Wuchang (which they did on 10 October), while regional Kuomintang representative Niu Yongjian assured him that an uprising would break out in Shanghai to support him against Sun. Though Xia continued to pretend to be neutral during summer 1926, he began to prepare his bid for autonomy from Sun. He cut the railway from Zhejiang to Shanghai (Sun's center of power) and dispersed the garrison of Hangzhou to weaken Sun's grip on the province.

=== Rebellion and death ===
On 16 October, Xia publicly declared independence for Zhejiang with the support of several local commanders and civilian officials, and called upon all soldiers from Zhejiang to return to their home. Many followed this call, and he quickly amassed an army of about 10,000 fighters. These troops were not well trained or armed. Xia was also appointed "provisional chairman" of the province by the Kuomintang and commander of the 18th Corps by the NRA. Following his defection, Xia launched an attack on Sun-controlled Shanghai with 2,500 troops. Even though Sun had detected Xia's plans days earlier, he had few troops to spare in the defense of Shanghai and thus ordered the railway to the city from Hangzhou torn up. By late 17 October, Xia's force was just 5 kilometres of the city. At this point, Sun received reinforcements to defend the city, whereupon Xia's advance was blocked. Nevertheless, the promised uprising in Shanghai failed to materialize, as the local Communist Party and Kuomintang leaders still debated about the course and chances of success for a rebellion in the city. Though several Communists urged action, Niu Yongjian refused, reasoning that the Shanghai insurgents lacked sufficient arms.

Xia was consequently forced to retreat, and attempted to salvage the situation before his former superior launched a counter-attack. He sent a message to Sun's subordinates, claiming that he had been deceived into defecting to the Kuomintang, whereupon the warlord pretended to accept this explanation. In truth, however, Sun's army marched into Zhejiang on 20 October and ambushed the rebel force near Jiaxing during the night. Though Xia managed to escape, 6,000 of his barely trained soldiers were captured after a short battle. Hundreds of them were then machine-gunned for taking part in the rebellion. Sun's army captured Jiaxing on 21st and Hangzhou on 23rd, marking Xia's final defeat. The warlord soldiers were let loose on Xia's provisional capital, looting the city while carrying out a "terrible massacre" among its civilian population. Attempting to flee into Zhejiang's hills in his car, Xia was captured soon after, and promptly shot on the streets of a nearby town. His severed head was then brought to Nanjing and put on a spike as warning to others. Sun appointed Chen Yi as new governor of Zhejiang, but Chen promptly declared independence as well, this time with more success. Meanwhile, Niu Yongjian had ordered the launch of the rebellion in Shanghai on 23 October. It remains unknown why the Shanghai uprising began on the same day when their potential ally Xia was defeated, though it has been speculated that the insurgent leadership was misinformed about the outcome of the fighting in Zhejiang and believed that Xia had won.

== Bibliography ==
- Bonavia, David (1995). China's warlords. Oxford, Hong Kong, New York City: Oxford University Press.
- Jowett, Philip S. (2014). The Armies of Warlord China 1911–1928. Atglen, Pennsylvania: Schiffer Publishing. ISBN 978-0764343452.
- Jordan, Donald A. (1976a). "Provincialism within the Chinese National Revolution: The Case of Chekiang, 1926–1927". In F. Gilbert Chan; Thomas H. Etzold (eds.). China in the 1920s. Nationalism and Revolution. New York City, London: Franklin Watts. ISBN 0-531-05383-0.
- Jordan, Donald A. (1976b). The Northern Expedition: China's National Revolution of 1926–1928. University Press of Hawaii. ISBN 9780824803520.
- Shêng, Hu; Danian, Liu (1983). The 1911 Revolution: A Retrospective After 70 Years. New World Press.
- Schoppa, R. Keith (1995). Blood Road: The Mystery of Shen Dingyi in Revolutionary China. Berkeley, Los Angeles, London: University of California Press. ISBN 9780520213869.
- Schoppa, R. Keith (1982). Chinese Elites and Political Change: Zhejiang Province in the Early Twentieth Century. Cambridge, Massachusetts; London: Harvard University Press. ISBN 9780674123250.
- Smith, Stephen Anthony (2000). A Road Is Made: Communism in Shanghai, 1920–1927. Honolulu: University of Hawaii. ISBN 9780824823146.
- Waldron, Arthur (2002). From War to Nationalism: China's Turning Point, 1924–1925. Cambridge: Cambridge University Press. ISBN 978-0-521-52332-5.
- Wilbur, Clarence Martin; How, Julie Lien-ying (1989). Missionaries of Revolution: Soviet Advisers and Nationalist China, 1920–1927. Harvard University Press. ISBN 9780674576520.
- Yeh, Wen-hsin (1996). Provincial Passages: Culture, Space, and the Origins of Chinese Communism. Berkeley, Los Angeles, London: University of California Press.
