= Dia'ngai =

Breed of ornamental carp native to the Ou River, Zhejiang, China

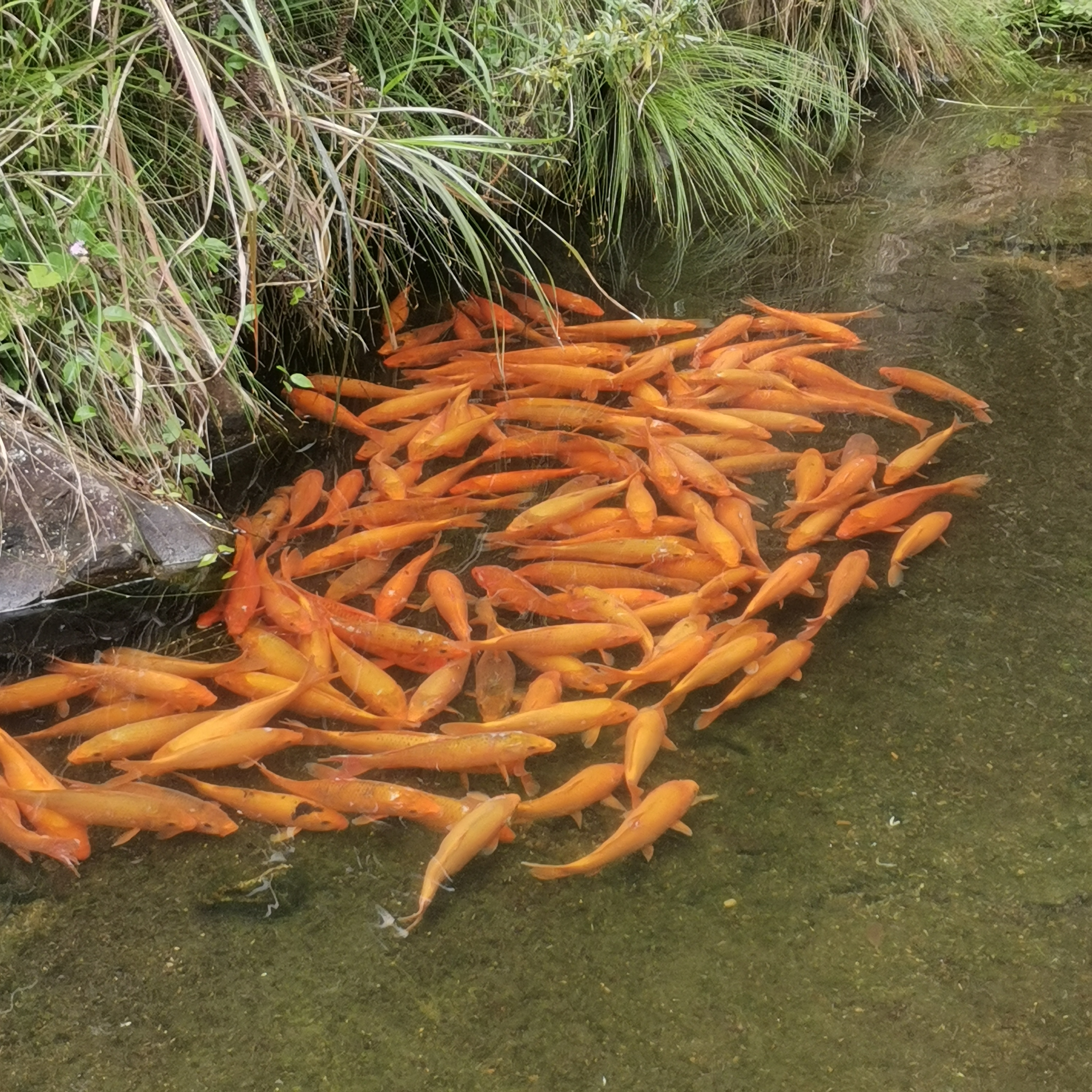
A group of dia'ngai swimming in a pond, photographed in Fangshan, Qingtian County

Dia'ngai ("田鱼" Mandarin: tián yú, Qingtianese: dia2 ngae2 in Wugniu Romanization, IPA: tiɑ³¹ŋɛ³¹), formally named Cprinus carpio var. color, is a traditional local breed of ornamental carp native to the Ou River basin in Southern Zhejiang, China. Widely found throughout the region, it has a long history of pisciculture that could be attested to more than 1,200 years ago.

Renowned for its rich historical and cultural values, it has been bred for centuries in the rice paddyfields in Qingtian, and was officially recognised by the Food and Agriculture Organization of the United Nations as one of the Globally Important Agricultural Heritage Systems (GIAHS) on May 16, 2005, serving as an important emblem of Qingtian and the wider region's agricultural heritage and overseas diaspora identity.

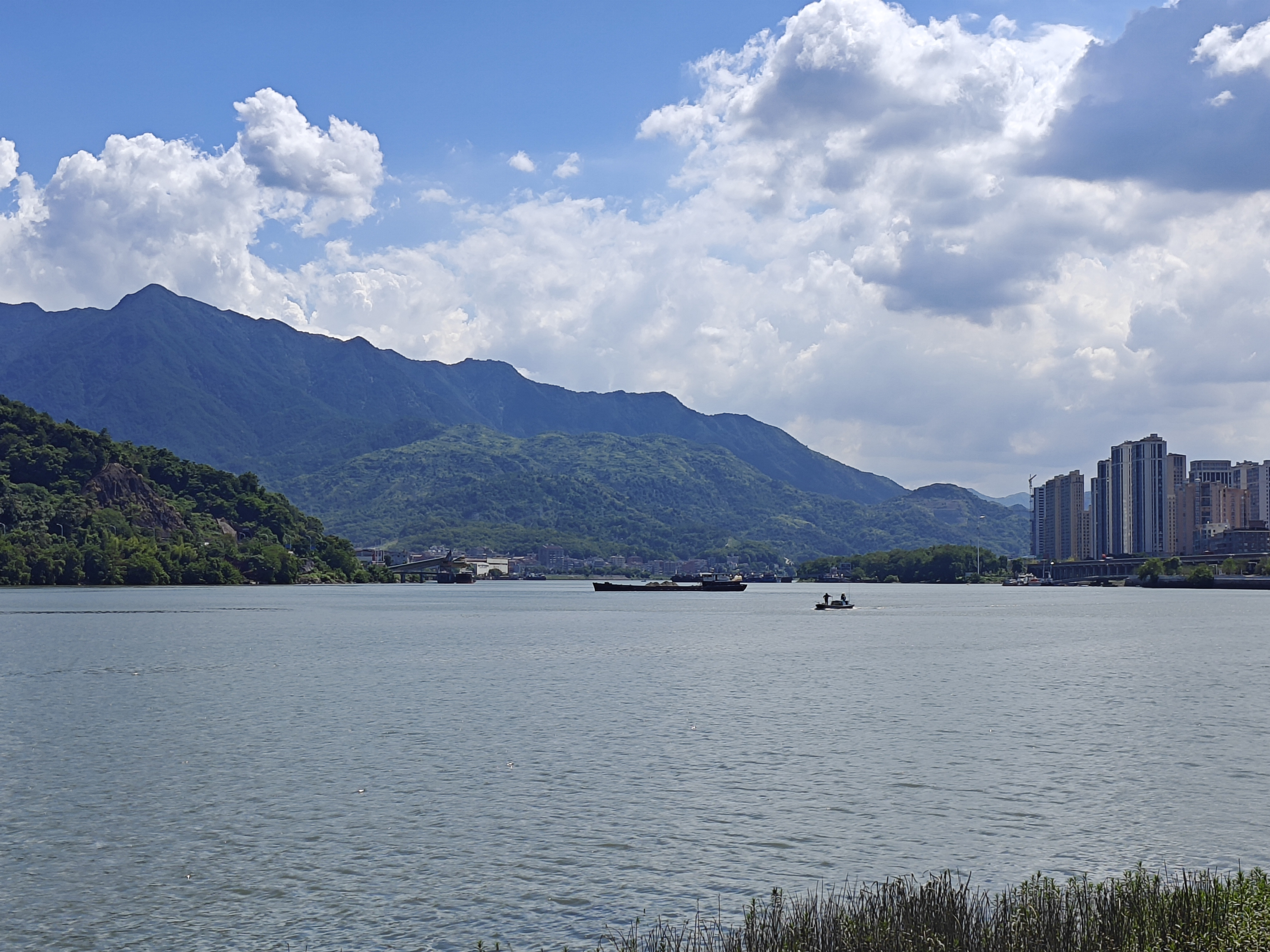
The shore of Ou River

== Place of origin ==
The dia'ngai can be found in waters throughout the entire Ou River, and aside from Qingtian, the farming of this fish also exists in regions and counties like Longquan and Yunhe.

== Physical traits ==
A group of dia'ngai swimming in a clear pond

Dia'ngai resembles a carp in shape and is as colorful as goldfish. Its color can vary from red, black, white and mottled, whereas its scales can be both large or small.

== Culinary and aesthetic value ==
People have traditionally kept dia'ngai as an ornamental fish for centuries due to its beautiful and bright colors comparable to that of the Japanese koi. On the other hand, dia'ngai is also rich in nutritional values, and is therefore an important ingredient to the cuisines of Qingtian and wider regions.

== See also ==
- Fishing in China
- Chinese culture
- Culture of Zhejiang
- Agriculture in China
