= Qiaoxiang =

Regions in China with large overseas communities

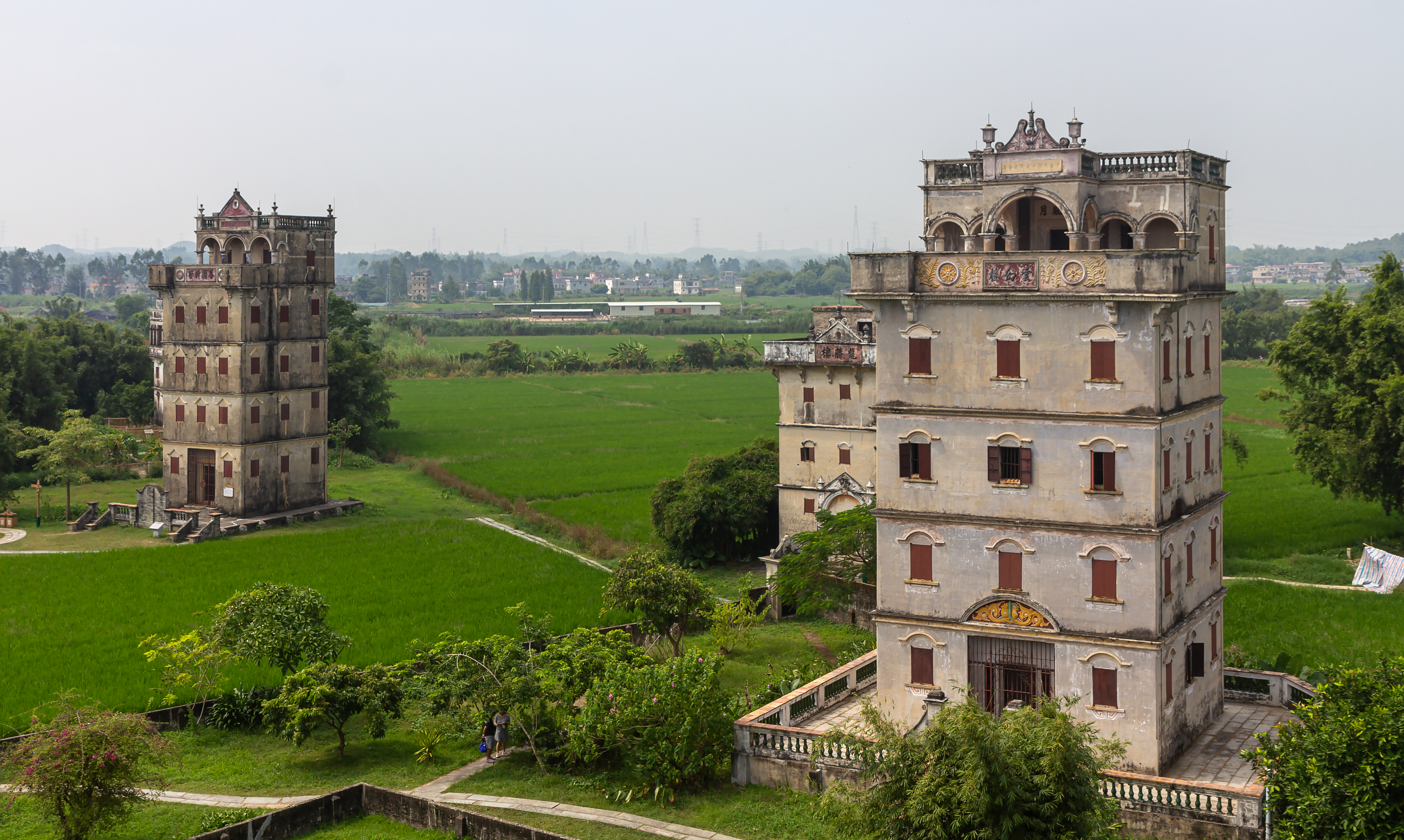
- The Diaolou in Kaiping, built by Chinese returning from overseas

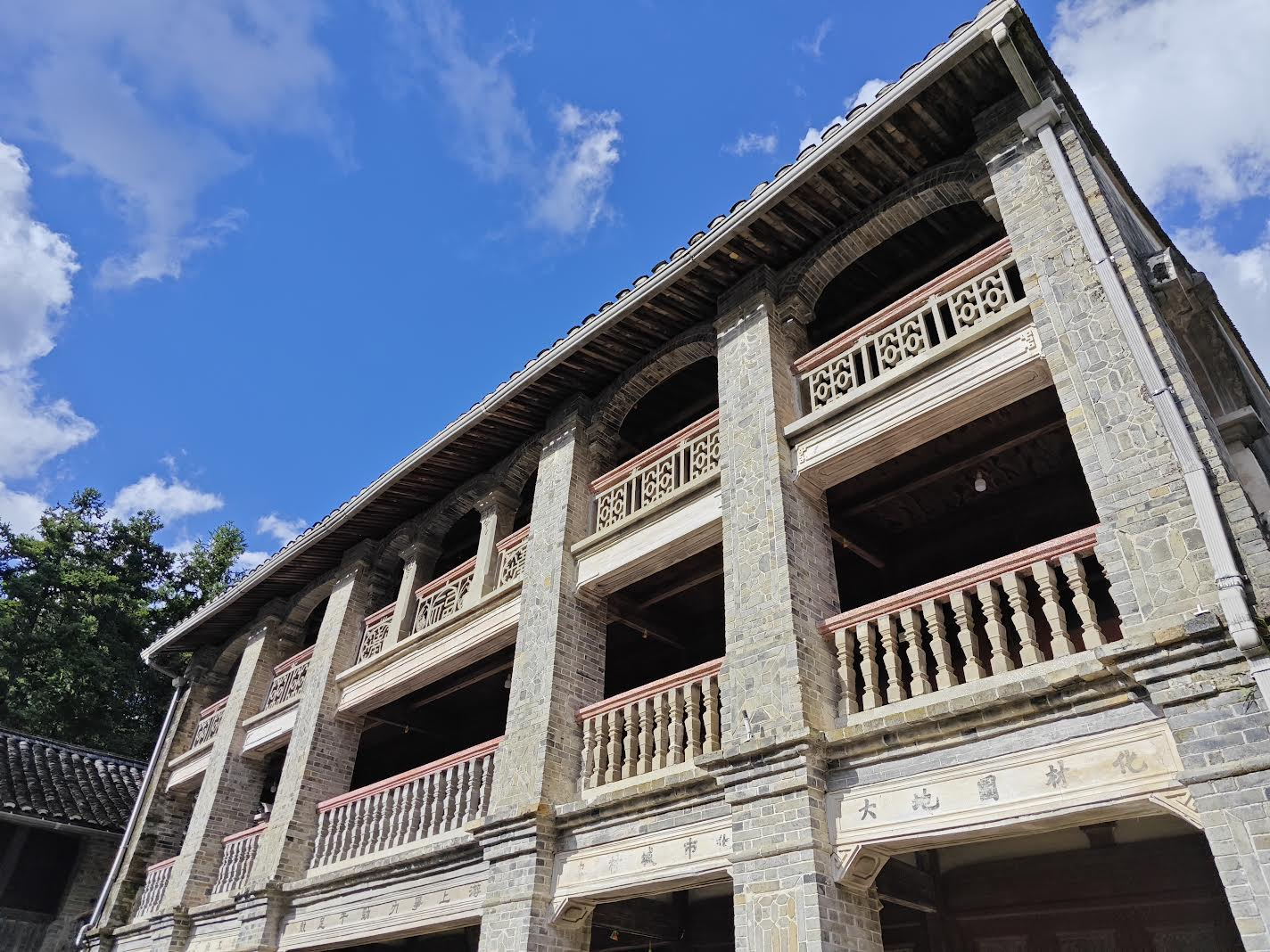
- European-style villa of Wu Qiankui, a Belgian overseas Chinese, in Longxian village, Qingtian
- Traditional Chinese: 僑鄉
- Simplified Chinese: 侨乡
- Literal meaning: Hometown of Overseas Chinese
Transcriptions
Standard Mandarin
- Bopomofo: ㄑㄧㄠˊ ㄒㄧㄤˊ
- Wade–Giles: Ch'iao hsiang
- IPA: tɕʰjɑʊ35 ɕjɑŋ55
Wu
- Romanization: Jiuao2 shie1
Hakka
- Romanization: Kiau Hiông
Yue: Cantonese
- Jyutping: kiu4 hoeng1
Southern Min
- Bbánlám Pìngyīm: Kiâu-hiong
- Teochew Peng'im: Kiao5 hion1
Eastern Min
- Fuzhou BUC: Kiè-siòng
Pu-Xian Min
- Hinghwa BUC: Gieu2-hieu1

Qiaoxiang (Chinese: 侨乡; lit. 'hometown of overseas Chinese') is a Chinese ceremonial title that refers to regions (mostly categorized at county-level) in China with significant overseas communities, or have a long history and tradition of emigration abroad.

The classification of a qiaoxiang is generally irrespective of provincial provenance, however, Guangdong and Fujian in particular have some of the most well-established overseas Chinese communities both in their size and influence, whereas many counties in provinces like Zhejiang, Guangxi, Hainan, and Northern province of Shandong are also renowned for being homes to various Chinese diasporic groups across the world.

== Etymology ==
The term 'qiáoxiāng' (Chinese characters: 侨乡) is composed of two characters: "侨" and "乡". The character "侨" originally means "sojourning", "guest dwelling", "living temporarily away from one's native place"; ancient texts such as Han Feizi (韩非子) already use "侨居" (qiáojū) to denote "residing abroad or in a place away from home". Whereas the character "乡" means "hometown", "home village", or more broadly "the local place of one's roots or original residence".

Combined, "侨乡" means a locality that serves as the hometown or place of ancestry for many overseas Chinese and their extended family members, where significant numbers of people have migrated abroad and maintained enduring ties to their place of origin, and where the cultural heritage of diaspora and economic network of remittance are historically strong.

Various academic research attests that the term "侨乡" came into use in its present meaning at least by the 1940s in China.

== List of Qiaoxiang ==
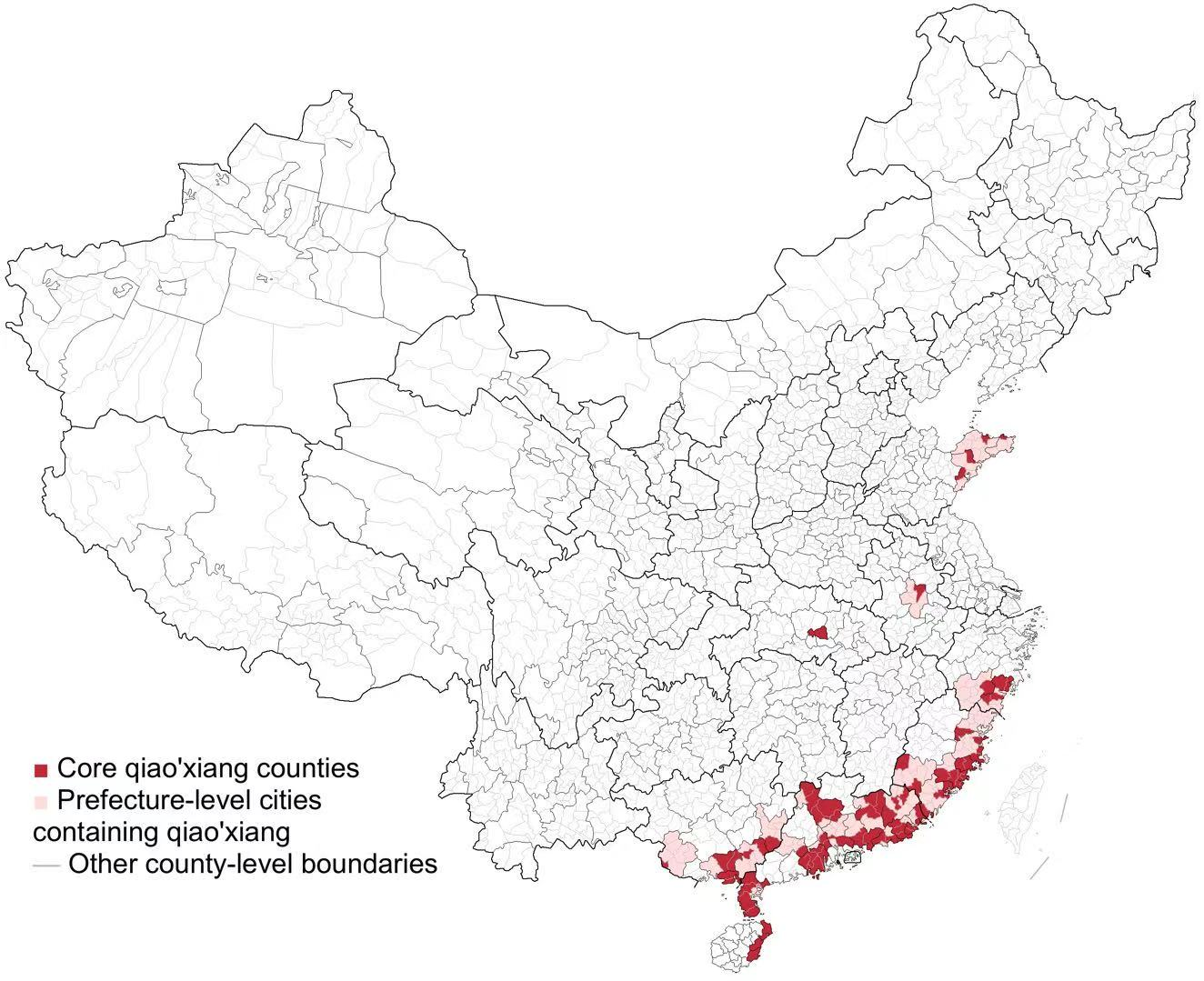
Map of major qiaoxiangs in China at the county level. Dark red areas represent core qiaoxiang counties with historically significant emigration to overseas Chinese communities, while light red areas indicate the prefecture-level jurisdictions in which these counties are located.

=== Guangdong ===
Guangdong has historically been the province in China with the earliest and largest number of overseas immigrants and maritime trade activities. By the end of 2021, Guangdong had more than 30 million overseas Chinese, accounting for more than half of the total number of overseas Chinese in China.

They are scattered in more than 160 countries and regions around the world, mainly in Southeast Asia (Indonesia, Thailand, Malaysia, Singapore, Cambodia, and Vietnam), Europe (United Kingdom, France, and Germany), North America (United States, Canada, and Mexico), South America (Peru, Brazil, and Venezuela), Central America (Panama), Oceania (Australia and New Zealand), and Africa (Mauritius, Madagascar, and South Africa).

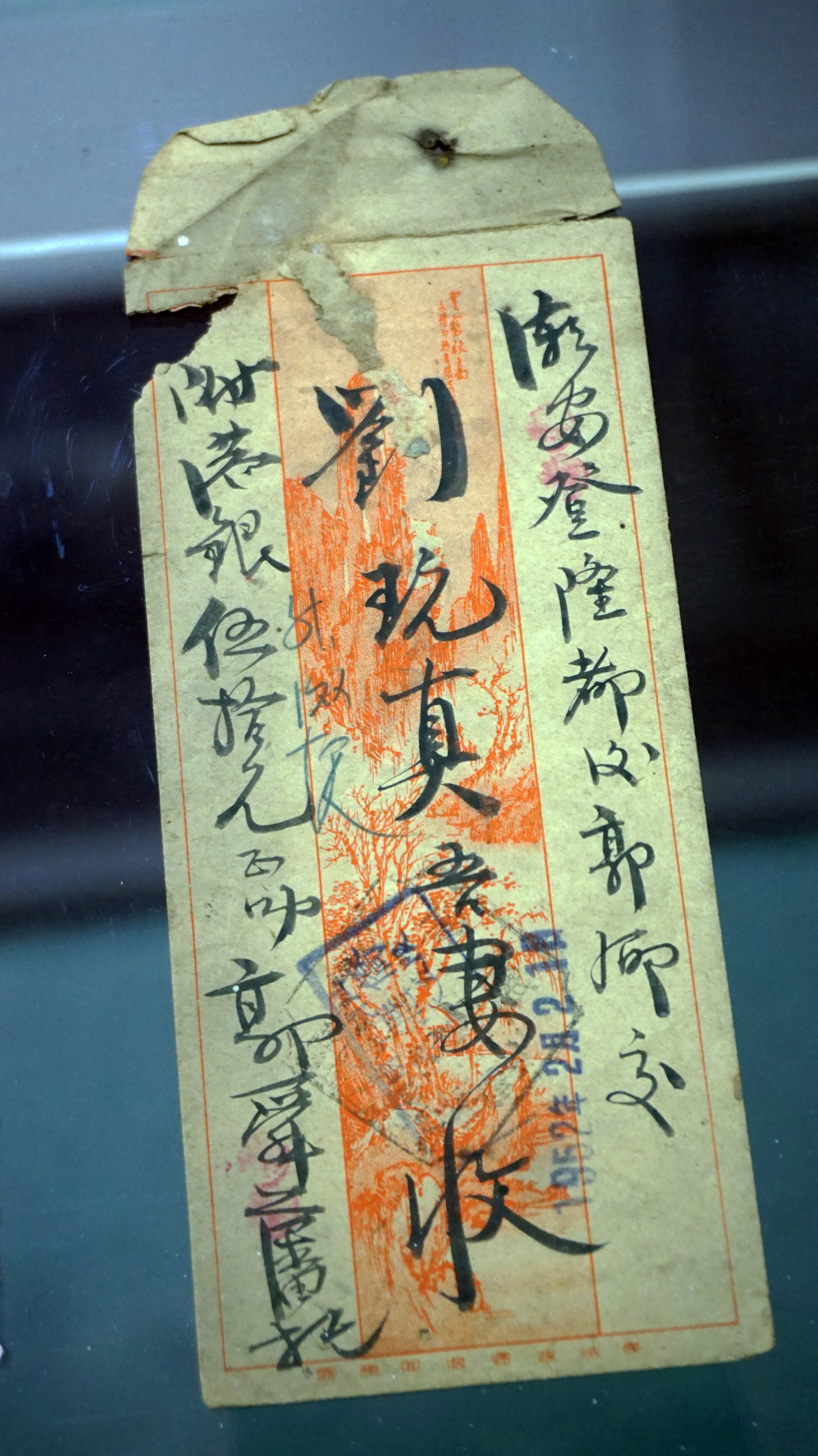
A Qiaopi (侨批: overseas Chinese remittance) of 50 Hong Kong Dollars sent by a Teochew diaspora to his wife Liu Nuang-Zing in Chao'an.

==== Siyi (四邑 Sei3-yap1) ====
1. Jiangmen (江门, Gong1-mun4）
  1. Taishan (台山,Toi4-saan1, Hoisan)
  2. Kaiping (开平, Hoi1-ping4, Hoi3-pen6)
  3. Enping (恩平, Jan1-ping4)
  4. Heshan (鹤山, Hok6-saan1)
  5. Xinhui (新会, San1-wui6)

==== Chaoshan (潮汕 Dio5-suan1) ====
1. Shantou (汕头, Suaⁿ-thâu)
  1. Chenghai (澄海, Thêng-hái)
  2. Haojiang (濠江, Hao5-gang1)
  3. Nan'ao (南澳, Nam5-o3)
  4. Chaonan (潮南, Dio5-nam5)
2. Chaozhou (潮州, Dio5-ziu1)
  1. Raoping (饶平, Bên5-pên5)
3. Jieyang (揭阳, Gêg4-ion5)
  1. Puning (普宁, Pou2-lêng5)
  2. Huilai (惠来, Hui6-lai5)
  3. Jiexi (揭西, Giah4-sai1)

==== Meizhou (梅州 Mòi-chû) ====
1. Meixian (梅县, Mòi-yen)

=== Fujian ===
Fujian has long been one of the most important homelands of overseas Chinese, with a migration history stretching back to the Song and Yuan dynasties. The province's rugged coastline, maritime culture, and historic engagement with overseas trade formed the foundations for large-scale emigration. By the 21st century, people of Fujianese origin were settled across more than 100 countries and regions, particularly in Southeast Asia, as well as in Europe, North America, and Oceania. Fujian's overseas communities are linguistically and culturally diverse, represented mainly by Hokkien, Mindong, Hinghwa and Hakka speakers. Many counties in the province are recognized as prominent qiaoxiangs due to their high percentage of emigration and strong networks with communities abroad.

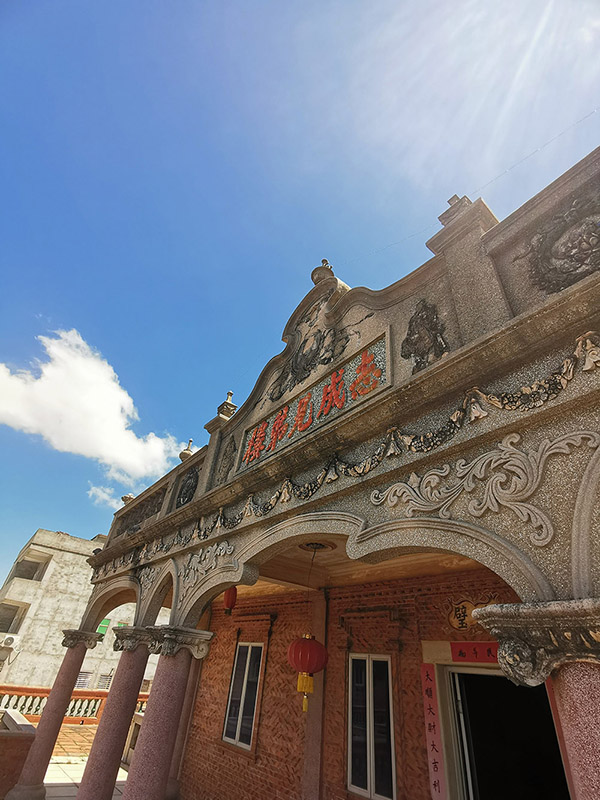
Gongchen Villa (拱辰别墅), built by Filipino Chinese Xu Zhibei (许志北) in Wukeng village, Jinjiang, Fujian.

==== Mindong (闽东 Mìng-dĕng) ====
1. Fuzhou (福州, Hók-ciŭ)
  1. Changle (长乐, Diŏng-lŏk)
  2. Fuqing (福清, Hók-chĭng)
  3. Lianjiang (连江, Lièng-gŏng)
2. Ningde (宁德, Nìng-dáik)
  1. Gutian (古田, Kŭ-chèng)
  2. Xiapu (霞浦, Hà-puō)

Hinghwa (兴化 Hing-hua̍)

1. Putian (莆田, Pó-chéng)
  1. Hanjiang (涵江, Háng-gang)
  2. Xianyou (仙游, Sing-iú)

==== Minnan (闽南 Bân-lâm) ====
1. Quanzhou (泉州, Choân-chiu)
  1. Jinjiang (晋江, Chìn-kang)
  2. Nan'an (南安, Lâm-oaⁿ)
  3. Shi'shi (石狮, Tsio̍h-sai)
  4. Anxi (安溪, An-khoe）
2. Zhangzhou (漳州, Chiang-chiu)
  1. Longhai (龙海, Liông-hái)
  2. Dongshan (东山, Tang-soaⁿ)
  3. Zhao'an (诏安, Tsiàu-an)
3. Xiamen (厦门, Ē-mn̂g)

=== Zhejiang ===
Zhejiang is one of the major sources of overseas Chinese migration in Eastern China. Although smaller in demographic scale than Guangdong or Fujian, its emigration history is deeply rooted in the mountainous southern counties of Wenzhou and Lishui, where limited arable land and strong clan and communal-based mobility encouraged people to seek opportunities abroad.

Since the late-Qing period, large number of emigrants from Zhejiang settled in Europe, especially Italy, Spain, France, Portugal and the Netherlands, whose strong commercial networks and family ties have created highly visible diaspora clusters overseas, earning many counties in southern Zhejiang the title of qiaoxiang.

1. Wenzhou (温州, Iu1-cieu1)
  1. Wencheng (文成, Van2-zen2)
  2. Rui'an (瑞安, Zy6-iu1)
  3. Yueqing (乐清, Ngo8-tshen1)
2. Lishui (丽水, Li6 syu3)
  1. Qingtian (青田, Chin1-dia2)

=== Hainan ===
1. Wenchang (文昌, Boon-Siou)
2. Qionghai (琼海, Keng Hai)
3. Wanning (万宁, Ban Ning)

=== Hubei ===
1. Tianmen (天门)

The county of Tianmen in Hubei is located in an inland province with no direct access to sea. It is home to more than 280,000 overseas Chinese across around 40 countries and regions in the world.

The people of Tianmen began emigrating in the late 18th century, experiencing several stages including the northward migration to Europe, the southward migration to Southeast Asia, and the renewed immigration worldwide in the recent period.

=== Heilongjiang ===
1. Fangzheng (方正)

Fangzheng County in Heilongjiang is a rare example of qiaoxiang in Northeast China. Its emigration history is closely connected to the legacy of Japanese settlement in Manchuria and the repatriation of Japanese war orphans and women after the normalization of Sino-Japan relations in 1972. These returnees helped relatives, friends and fellow villagers from Fangzheng migrate to Japan for work, education and marriage.

By the 2000s, Fangzheng had become a major sending place of new Chinese migrants to Japan, and in 2006 declared itself a "Hometown for Chinese living in Japan". According to the official statistics of Fangzheng, 38,000 people from the town, which is one fifth of Fangzheng's population, now live overseas, overwhelmingly in Japan.

== See also ==
- Overseas Chinese
- List of countries by remittances received
- Overseas Chinese Affairs Office
