= Gaohu, Zhejiang =

Gaohu 高湖镇
- Town
- Location in Zhejiang
- Coordinates: 28.33673°N 120.21782°E
- Country: People's Republic of China
- Province: Zhejiang
- Prefecture-level city: Lishui
- County: Qingtian County
- Time zone: UTC+8 (China Standard)

Gaohu (Chinese: 高湖; pinyin: Gāohú) is a town in Qingtian County, in Zhejiang province, China. As of 2018, it has 10 villages under its administration.
