= Grand Chancellor =

Grand Chancellor may refer to:

- Grand Chancellor, a senior governmental post under an emperor, monarch or president
- Grand chancellor (China), an official in the imperial Chinese government
- Grand Chancellor of Denmark, a historic Danish title
- Grand Chancellor of France, an officer in the Ancien Régime
- Grand chancellor (Republic of Venice), head of the ducal chancery of Venice
- Grand Chancellor of the Crown, one of the highest officials in historic Poland
- Hotel Grand Chancellor, a hotel chain in Australia and New Zealand

== See also ==
- Archchancellor or chief chancellor, the highest dignitary of the Holy Roman Empire
