= List of countries by remittances received =

This is a list of countries by remittances received from abroad. Remittances, defined as monetary transfers made by migrants to their home countries, play a crucial role in global economies and the livelihoods of individuals and families. In some countries, remittances account for more than 30% of the total economic output.

== List ==
Remittances received (2023/2024, World Bank)
| Country | Remittances received (USD millions) | % of GDP | Remittances per capita (USD) |
|---|---|---|---|
| India | 137,675 | 3.5 | 96 |
| Mexico | 67,638 | 3.7 | 526 |
| Philippines | 40,279 | 8.7 | 343 |
| France | 36,861 | 1.2 | 541 |
| Pakistan | 34,914 | 9.4 | 145 |
| China | 31,411 | 0.2 | 22 |
| Bangladesh | 35,562 | 6.3 | 173 |
| Guatemala | 21,649 | 19.1 | 1,176 |
| Nigeria | 21,293 | 11.3 | 95 |
| Germany | 21,225 | 0.5 | 255 |
| Egypt | 19,532 | 4.9 | 173 |
| Uzbekistan | 16,579 | 14.4 | 455 |
| Indonesia | 16,038 | 1.1 | 58 |
| Belgium | 15,208 | 2.3 | 1,300 |
| Nepal | 14,185 | 33.1 | 459 |
| Vietnam | 14,000 | 3.2 | 141 |
| Ukraine | 11,969 | 6.3 | 326 |
| Colombia | 11,873 | 2.8 | 228 |
| Morocco | 11,755 | 8.1 | 311 |
| Dominican Republic | 11,247 | 9.0 | 995 |
| Italy | 11,152 | 0.5 | 189 |
| Thailand | 9,584 | 1.8 | 133 |
| Honduras | 9,533 | 25.7 | 899 |
| Romania | 9,524 | 2.5 | 501 |
| Poland | 8,688 | 0.9 | 230 |
| El Salvador | 8,488 | 24.0 | 1,326 |
| United States | 7,870 | 0.0 | 23 |
| South Korea | 7,449 | 0.4 | 144 |
| Tajikistan | 6,802 | 47.9 | 673 |
| Croatia | 6,739 | 7.3 | 1,773 |
| Lebanon | 6,696 | 33.3 | 1,217 |
| Ecuador | 6,544 | 5.2 | 360 |
| Spain | 6,265 | 0.4 | 129 |
| Sri Lanka | 6,023 | 7.2 | 274 |
| Serbia | 5,772 | 7.1 | 875 |
| Nicaragua | 5,246 | 26.6 | 749 |
| Hungary | 5,237 | 2.3 | 545 |
| Brazil | 4,902 | 0.2 | 23 |
| United Kingdom | 4,834 | 0.1 | 71 |
| Sweden | 4,702 | 0.8 | 448 |
| Japan | 4,644 | 0.1 | 38 |
| Jordan | 4,480 | 8.8 | 390 |
| Peru | 4,446 | 1.7 | 129 |
| Netherlands | 4,358 | 0.4 | 243 |
| Czech Republic | 4,248 | 1.2 | 405 |
| Kenya | 4,228 | 3.9 | 77 |
| Georgia | 3,999 | 11.8 | 1,081 |
| Yemen | 3,771 | 17.5 (2018) | 110 |
| Haiti | 3,753 | 18.9 | 321 |
| Austria | 3,592 | 0.7 | 399 |
| Jamaica | 3,564 | 17.9 | 1,273 |
| Switzerland | 3,502 | 0.4 | 398 |
| Zimbabwe | 3,301 | 9.4 | 198 |
| Democratic Republic of the Congo | 3,298 | 4.9 | 32 |
| Senegal | 3,267 | 10.6 | 182 |
| Bosnia and Herzegovina | 3,124 | 11.0 | 976 |
| Tunisia | 2,872 | 6.0 | 230 |
| Kyrgyzstan | 2,850 | 18.8 | 419 |
| Cambodia | 2,828 | 6.1 | 166 |
| Slovakia | 2,741 | 1.9 | 508 |
| Bulgaria | 2,672 | 2.4 | 417 |
| Ghana | 2,431 | 3.0 | 71 |
| Luxembourg | 2,430 | 2.6 | 3,682 |
| Albania | 2,274 | 8.4 | 812 |
| Bermuda | 2,035 | 23.7 | 31,766 |
| Moldova | 1,918 | 10.5 | 777 |
| Russia | 1,908 | 0.1 | 13 |
| Australia | 1,884 | 0.1 | 71 |
| Algeria | 1,868 | 0.8 | 42 |
| Kosovo | 1,833 | 17.5 | 1,010 |
| Portugal | 1,805 | 0.6 | 174 |
| Somalia | 1,735 | 15.8 | 109 |
| Malaysia | 1,605 | 0.4 | 49 |
| Denmark | 1,526 | 0.4 | 260 |
| Bolivia | 1,449 | 3.2 | 120 |
| Qatar | 1,443 | 0.7 | 474 |
| Uganda | 1,431 | 2.9 | 31 |
| Belarus | 1,383 | 1.8 | 146 |
| Azerbaijan | 1,352 | 1.8 | 131 |
| Latvia | 1,336 | 3.1 | 706 |
| Armenia | 1,182 | 4.6 | 397 |
| South Sudan | 1,175 | 9.5 (2015) | 99 |
| Iraq | 1,162 | 0.4 | 27 |
| Myanmar | 1,100 | 1.6 | 20 |
| Lithuania | 1,053 | 1.2 | 355 |
| Mali | 1,045 | 4.2 | 49 |
| Argentina | 1,045 | 0.2 | 23 |
| Ivory Coast | 1,042 | 1.3 | 38 |
| Sudan | 1,000 | 2.5 | 22 |
| Turkey | 982 | 0.1 | 11 |
| Israel | 952 | 0.2 | 104 |
| Paraguay | 878 | 2.0 | 121 |
| South Africa | 855 | 0.2 | 14 |
| Montenegro | 855 | 10.6 | 1,360 |
| Slovenia | 852 | 1.2 | 406 |
| Canada | 851 | 0.0 | 22 |
| New Zealand | 816 | 0.3 | 163 |
| Liberia | 800 | 18.2 | 150 |
| Cameroon | 787 | 1.6 | 29 |
| Tanzania | 759 | 1.0 | 12 |
| Finland | 749 | 0.2 | 135 |
| Palestine | 736 | 5.4 | 136 |
| Costa Rica | 725 | 0.8 | 140 |
| Togo | 650 | 7.1 | 76 |
| Niger | 624 | 3.7 | 24 |
| Cyprus | 622 | 1.8 | 506 |
| Norway | 621 | 0.1 | 113 |
| New Caledonia | 621 | 6.5 | 2,134 |
| Burkina Faso | 584 | 2.9 | 27 |
| French Polynesia | 582 | 9.1 | 1,933 |
| Ireland | 571 | 0.1 | 111 |
| Greece | 561 | 0.2 | 52 |
| Guyana | 546 | 3.2 | 680 |
| Ethiopia | 539 | 0.4 | 4 |
| Panama | 532 | 0.6 | 121 |
| Gambia | 529 | 21.1 | 208 |
| Rwanda | 518 | 3.6 | 38 |
| Fiji | 500 | 9.2 | 548 |
| Lesotho | 499 | 22.0 | 231 |
| Guinea | 497 | 2.2 | 37 |
| Estonia | 496 | 1.2 | 374 |
| Hong Kong | 462 | 0.1 | 61 |
| North Macedonia | 458 | 2.7 | 220 |
| Mongolia | 455 | 2.2 | 135 |
| Madagascar | 385 | 2.4 | 13 |
| Benin | 339 | 1.7 | 26 |
| Cape Verde | 336 | 12.1 | 593 |
| Saudi Arabia | 322 | 0.0 | 9 |
| Afghanistan | 320 | 1.9 | 8 |
| Mauritius | 315 | 2.2 | 248 |
| Comoros | 306 | 21.4 | 337 |
| Sierra Leone | 293 | 4.6 | 35 |
| Laos | 287 | 1.8 | 37 |
| Samoa | 282 | 26.4 | 1,410 |
| Mozambique | 267 | 1.2 | 8 |
| Tonga | 257 | 50.0 | 2,570 |
| Zambia | 246 | 0.9 | 12 |
| Iceland | 241 | 0.7 | 668 |
| Kazakhstan | 240 | 0.1 | 12 |
| Timor-Leste | 220 | 11.7 | 163 |
| Guinea-Bissau | 204 | 9.8 | 99 |
| Trinidad and Tobago | 199 | 0.8 | 140 |
| Burundi | 198 | 7.5 | 15 |
| Malawi | 180 | 1.4 | 9 |
| Curaçao | 177 | 5.4 | 1,073 |
| Mauritania | 168 | 1.6 | 34 |
| Suriname | 160 | 3.4 | 268 |
| Faroe Islands | 158 | 4.1 | 3,038 |
| Belize | 154 | 4.4 | 372 |
| Vanuatu | 145 | 12.9 | 442 |
| Namibia | 143 | 1.1 | 55 |
| Uruguay | 136 | 0.2 | 39 |
| Macau | 112 | 0.2 | 168 |
| Bhutan | 110 | 3.6 | 138 |
| Chile | 100 | 0.0 | 5 |
| Solomon Islands | 95 | 5.4 | 133 |
| Saint Vincent and the Grenadines | 94 | 8.2 | 847 |
| Barbados | 85 | 1.3 | 296 |
| Eswatini | 80 | 1.7 | 68 |
| Grenada | 70 | 5.0 | 620 |
| Botswana | 70 | 0.4 | 28 |
| Bahamas | 66 | 0.4 | 163 |
| Saint Lucia | 65 | 2.5 | 350 |
| Djibouti | 56 | 1.4 | 55 |
| Sint Maarten | 48 | 3.0 | 1,091 |
| Andorra | 48 | 1.3 | 618 |
| Republic of the Congo | 44 | 0.3 | 7 |
| Oman | 39 | 0.0 | 7 |
| Aruba | 39 | 1.1 | 361 |
| Dominica | 38.6 | 5.6 | 536 |
| Saint Kitts and Nevis | 36.4 | 3.4 | 677 |
| Marshall Islands | 34.5 | 13.3 | 580 |
| Antigua and Barbuda | 26.3 | 1.2 | 267 |
| Federated States of Micronesia | 23.3 | 5.3 | 226 |
| San Marino | 21.9 | 1.2 | 644 |
| Kuwait | 20.4 | 0.0 | 5 |
| Gabon | 18.5 | 0.1 | 8 |
| Malta | 15.4 | 0.1 | 32 |
| Angola | 14.1 | 0.0 | 0 |
| Kiribati | 11.6 | 4.0 | 90 |
| Seychelles | 11.4 | 0.5 | 114 |
| Cayman Islands | 10.8 | 0.2 | 315 |
| Papua New Guinea | 10.7 | 0.0 | 1 |
| São Tomé and Príncipe | 10.0 | 1.5 | 44 |
| Maldives | 5.7 | 0.1 | 15 |
| Tuvalu | 2.6 | 4.2 | 210 |
| Palau | 2.0 | 0.7 | 110 |
| Brunei | 1.0 | 0.0 | 2 |
| Nauru | 0.9 | 0.6 | 70 |
| World | 740,508 | 0.7 | 92 |
