= Qingtian dialect =

Dialect of Chinese

Qingtian
- 青田話 Chin1-dia2-wu6
- Pronunciation: tɕiŋ³³⁴ tiɑ³¹ ɦu²²
- Native to: People's Republic of China, Countries with significant populations of Qingtianese diaspora
- Region: Qingtian county, Lishui prefecture, Zhejiang province
- Native speakers: ~518,000
- Language family: Sino-Tibetan: Sinitic; Wu; Chuqu; Qingtian

Language codes
- ISO 639-3: –
- Glottolog: None qing1241 Qingtian

The Qingtian dialect (simplified Chinese: 青田话; traditional Chinese: 青田話; pinyin: Qīngtiánhuà, Wugniu: Chin1-dia2-wu6) is a dialect of the Chinese language, and is one of the Chuqu dialects of Wu Chinese spoken in Quzhou and Lishui prefectures of Zhejiang.

Aside from being spoken in Qingtian county of Lishui prefecture in Zhejiang, China, the dialect is also widely spoken in countries where diasporas from Qingtian settle.

== Phonology ==
The standard version of Qingtian dialect is based on the town of Hecheng (鹤城, go4-yin2), and has 29 initials, 49 finals, and 8 tones.

Initials Table of Qingtian Dialect
p^{1} 班包	t^{1} 丹當	k 街狗	ts 齋基	tɕ 姜专
pʰ 攀抛	tʰ 攤湯	kʰ 揩口	tsʰ 搓妻	tɕʰ 枪川
b 排旁	d 談堂	g 銜^{白讀}厚^{文讀}	dz 站奇	dʑ 强權
m 媽忙	n 奶閙	ŋ 蟻^{文讀}牛		ȵ 你元
f 翻方		h 喊吼	s 山西	ɕ 相宣
v 凡房		ɦ 鞋侯	z 柴齊	j 祥員
	l 拉郎			

== See also ==
- List of varieties of Chinese
- Wenzhounese
- Romanization of Wu Chinese
