= Qingtianese diaspora =

青田华侨 Chin^{1}-dia^{2}-wu^{6}-jiuao^{2}
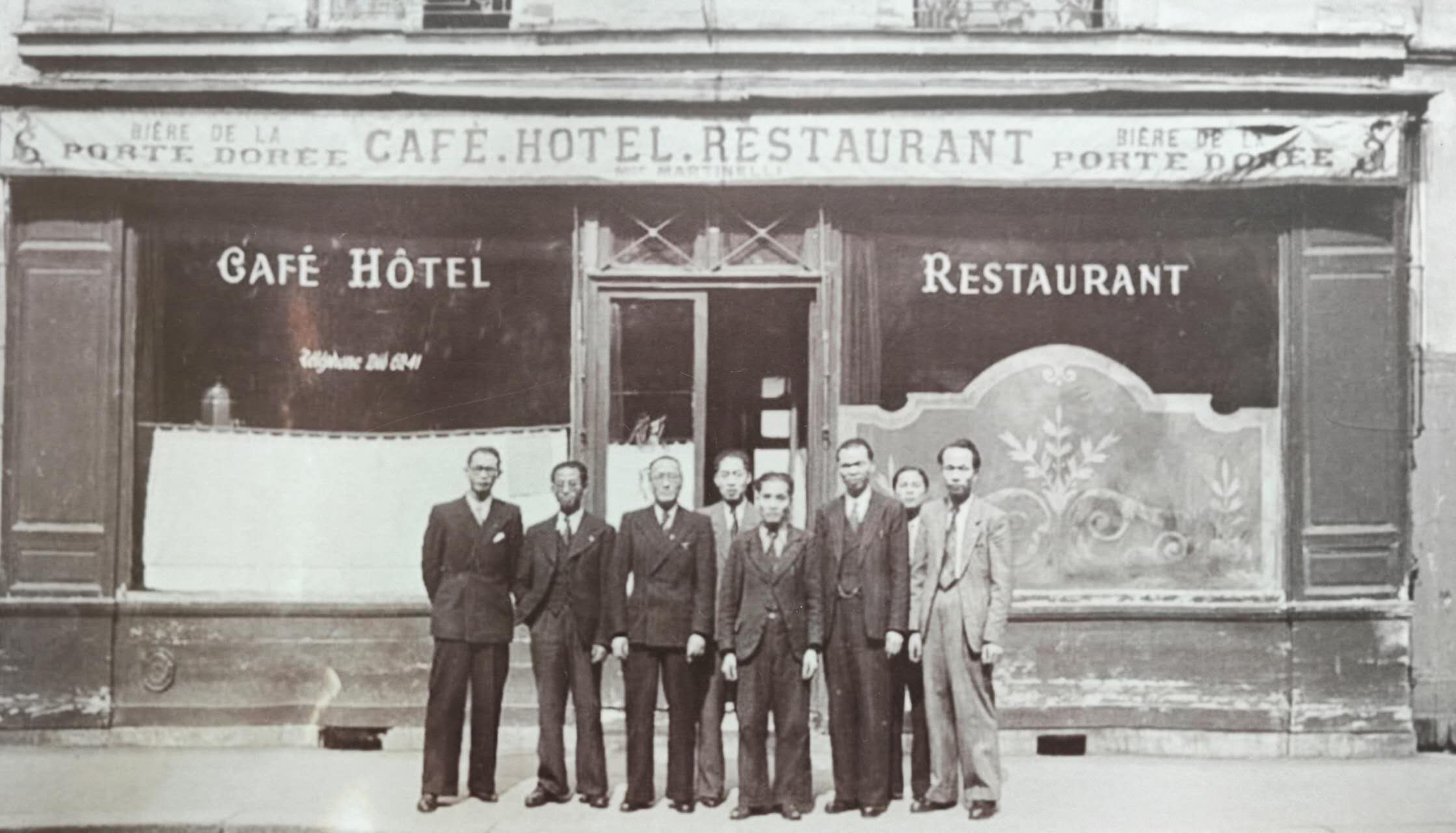
- Group photo of Qingtianese in France, early 20th century

Total population
- 381,000 worldwide

Regions with significant populations
- Spain: 125,000
- Italy: 103,000
- Portugal: 12,000
- Brazil: 11,000
- France: 9000
- Austria: 7000
- Germany: 5000
- Netherlands: 4000
- Belgium: 3000
- Serbia: 3000
- Greece: 2000
- Hungary: 2000

Languages
- Qingtian dialect; Wenzhounese; Mandarin; Spanish; Italian; French

Religion
- Chinese Buddhism; Confucianism; Chinese folk religion; Roman Catholicism; Protestantism

Related ethnic groups
- Wenzhounese; Wu Chinese; Overseas Chinese

The Qingtianese diaspora (Chinese: 青田华侨; pinyin: Qīngtián huáqiáo; Wugniu: Chin1-dia2-wu6-jiuao2) refers to overseas Chinese and their descendants that originated from Qingtian county, Lishui prefecture, Zhejiang province, China.

Qingtian is one of China's best-known qiaoxiang due to its centuries-old diasporan communities, whereas out of the county's 568,800 original inhabitants, as many as 381,000 of them are currently residing in 146 countries across the world, with the majority of communities in Europe, including Italy, France, Portugal, and especially Spain where they constitute over 80% of the entire Chinese community.

== History ==
The history of Qingtianese diasporan communities could be traced back to the late-Ming era and became established in the early days of the Republic of China, and the phase of its development could be roughly divided into three stages.

=== Ming and Qing era ===
Located in the hinterland of southern Zhejiang, approximately 90% of Qingtian's territory is covered by hilly mountains, with more than 200 peaks that have an altitude of over 1,000 meters. The county's steep geographical terrain is thus vividly described by locals as: "nine mountains, half water, and half farmland (九山半水半分田)", and scarce arable land was what pushed its people to emigrate abroad. According to the 1935 English edition of the China Yearbook (中国年鉴):

At the turn of the 17th and 18th centuries, there was already presence of a small number of Chinese who trekked overland through Siberia to Europe to engage in commerce. In the early days, most of them were from Qingtian, Zhejiang, and they specialized in selling stone handicrafts made from Qingtian.

In the aftermath of the Opium War, the stone merchants benefitted greatly from the lifting of the sea ban (海禁) policy by the imperial Qing government. With the ratification of the Treaty of Yantai in 1876, Wenzhou, the primary port city of Southern Zhejiang located at the mouth of the Ou River, was opened as a treaty port for international trade and maritime activities. This provided a much more convenient route for Qingtianese to travel abroad than the previous land routes.

==== Routes of emigration ====
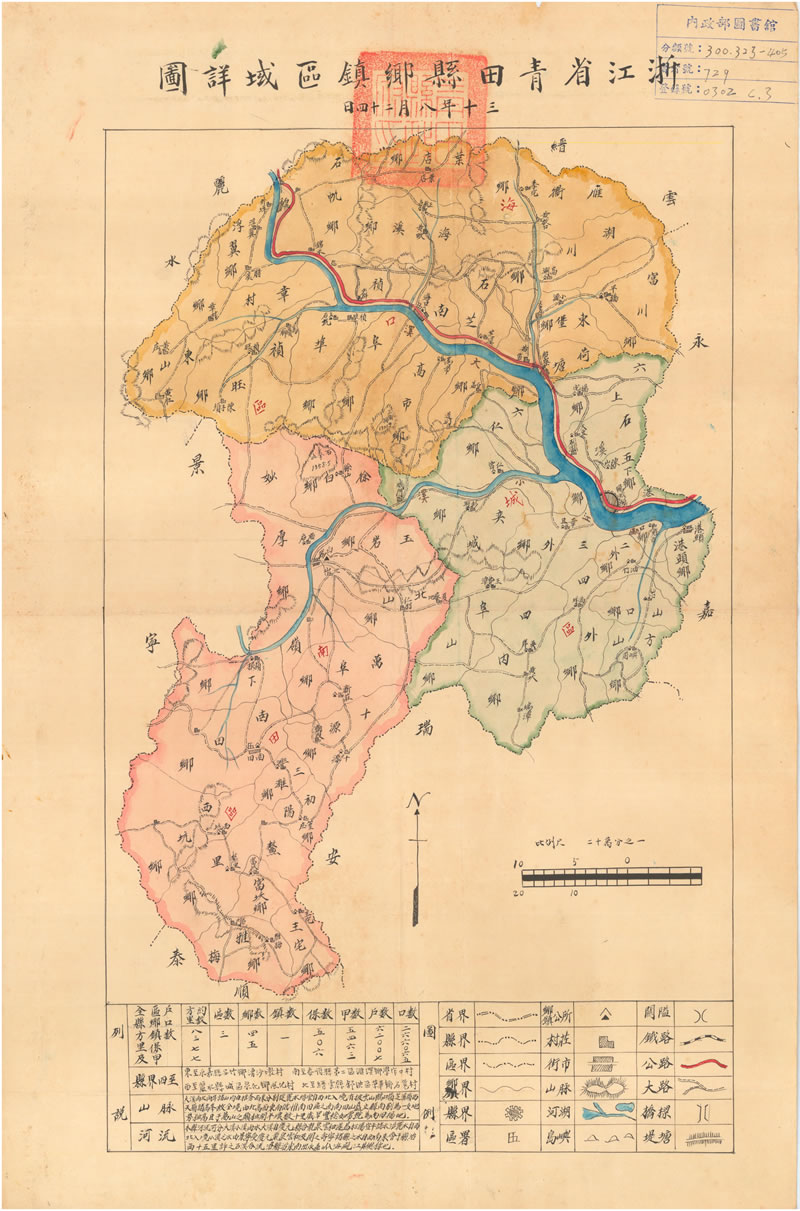
Administrative map of Qingtian county, 1941

In the early days, people from Qingtian often traveled overseas by both land and sea. Usually, they would first sail from the pier in Hecheng to Wenzhou, then take a boat from Wenzhou to Shanghai. After arriving in Shanghai, some would take a boat north to Lüshun (Port Arthur) or the Port of Yingkou, then leave China via Manchouli by land, embarking on a long travel across Siberia before arriving in Moscow or St. Petersburg, and from there travelling to various of other European countries.

Others went abroad by sea, with two different approaches. One was "藏舱" (literally "to hide in the cabin"), that is to let the middlemen of Shiliupu Wharf (十六铺码头) to first get in touch with the boatswain of the ocean-going ships, allowing them to disguise as sailors on board, and hid in the warehouse, utility room or sailor's room. After arriving at the destination, the boatswains would then let them ashore and sent them to the destination in the dead of night. In order to save money, some even took cargo ships and hid in containers, the voyage was long and the conditions were incredibly harsh, and the dead bodies of those who did not make it to the final destination due to lack of oxygen, food and water were subsequently thrown into the sea, which could have been the ultimate ending of many Qingtianese emigrants who had gone missing ever since leaving the homeland. Despite the extremely high risk, most Qingtianese still preferred this way to travel abroad as it would cost them only 200 silver coins.

The other option was to acquire a passport, or "明走" (literally "to go abroad openly"), which was 100 silver dollars more expensive than hiding in the cabin, but it was also relatively safer. At that time, there were service agencies in Shanghai that provided services such as purchasing passports, providing food and lodging, buying ship tickets, and contacting the boatswain for cabin matters, making it easier for county residents to go abroad. Regardless, whether going abroad openly or secretly, they both posed a heavy burden for the impoverished people of Qingtian. Most of them had to sell their lands, take debts or receive help from relatives and friends in order to have sufficient funds for the journey; only few of them were lucky enough to get financial supports from the older Qingtianese men who had already established themselves in foreign lands.

After departing from Shanghai, the steamships would pass through Hong Kong and Singapore, crossing the Strait of Malacca and detouring around the Cape of Good Hope (known as "大浪滩, du6-lo6-tha1" by the Qingtianese), heading north to the Strait of Gibraltar before finally arriving in Europe in the Mediterranean Sea, taking more than two months to complete the voyage. After the Suez Canal was opened to navigation in 1869, the ships were able to directly sail into the Mediterranean Sea through the canal and arrive in Marseille, France, or Naples, Italy, shortening the voyage by nearly 8,000 kilometers. Since then, there has been ever more frequent flows of Qingtianese people who took the journey to Europe.

==== Stone carving ====
The New York shop of Zhou Xuqing and Zhou Zhishan, specialising in the sale of Qingtian stone carvings, 1916

Qingtianese overseas migration was closely connected to the production and sale of Qingtian stone carvings (青田石雕), which became an important non-agricultural industry in Qingtian from the Ming period onward. The growth of stone-carving workshops, particularly in townships such as Fangshan, Shankou and Youzhu, created a body of merchants who travelled to sell their stone products. Between 1853 and 1915, overseas Chinese brought the Qingtian stone carvings to several international exhibitions, including events in Paris (1900), Milan (1906), St. Louis (1904) and most famously, the Panama-Pacific International Exposition (1915) held in San Francisco, where the Qingtianese notable Chen Qi led the Chinese delegation to major success, with Chinese exhibits receiving over 1,200 medals and awards, the highest at the fair. The international visibility acquired through these exhibitions enabled the early Qingtianese migrants to use stone carvings as a commercial "stepping stone" to enter foreign markets, and encouraged many more back home to follow similar paths of emigration in subsequent decades.

=== Republic era ===
In the early years of the Republic of China, almost the entire county was devastated by the flood brought by a heavy rainstorm on August 29, 1912. Extreme hardship in the aftermath of the floods prompted waves of exodus, which between 1912 and 1914, approximately a thousand people had left the county.

In the midst of First World War, Britain, France and other states had all experienced varying degrees of labor shortages, and following China's entry into the war on the side of Entente Powers in 1917, 140,000 to 150,000 Chinese Labour Corps were sent to serve on the Western Front, with Britain accounting for around 100,000, and France 40,000. According to statistics from the French Ministry of War in 1922, of the 36,941 Chinese workers employed in France, 31,409 were from North China, and of the 4,024 workers who were from the South, more than 2,000 were from Qingtian. After arriving in France, the Qingtianese workers mainly engaged in rear-area service work, such as transporting supplies, digging trenches, and building railways.

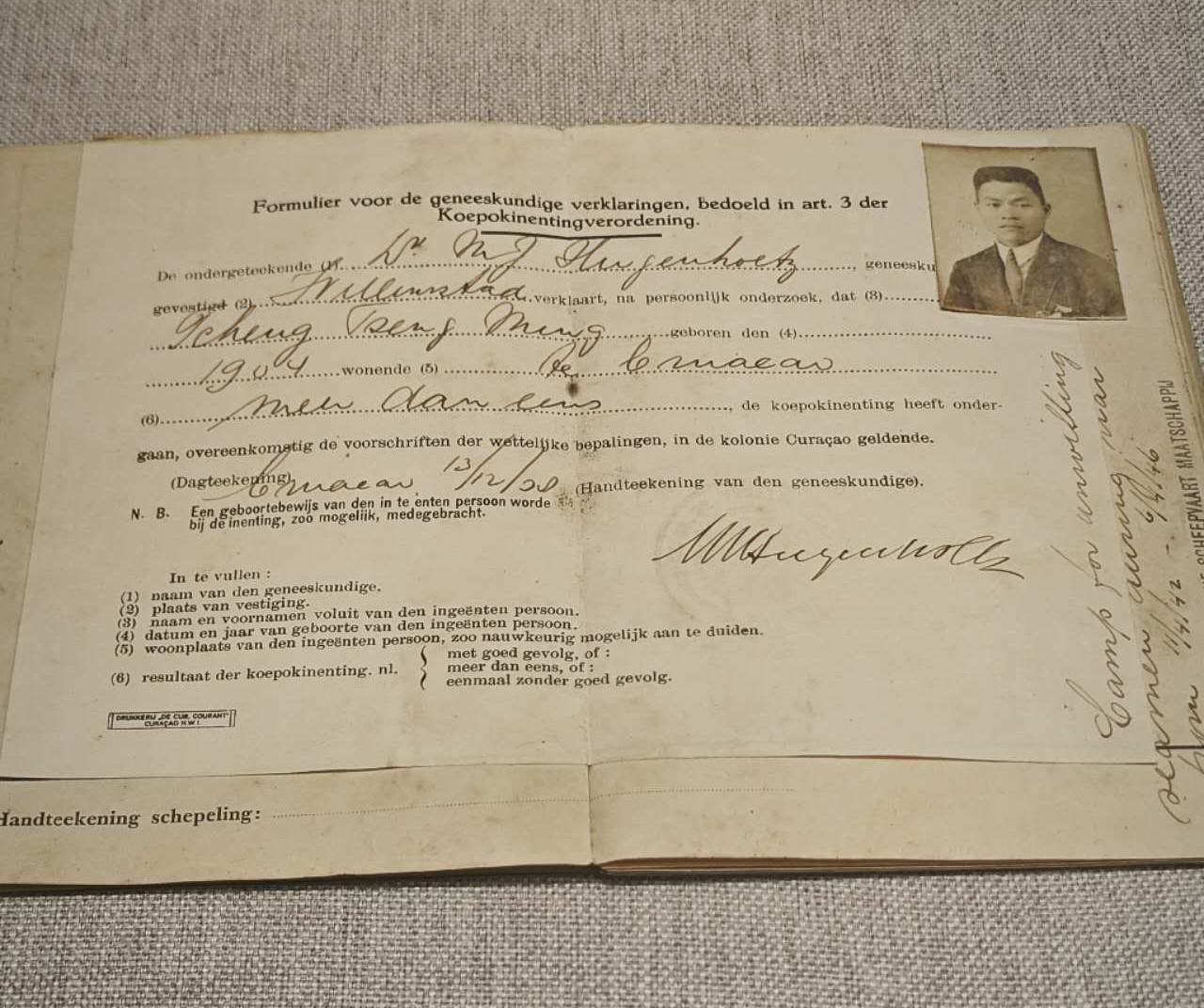
Work permit of "Curaçao" shipping company, a personal belonging of the seaman Wu Shunlan (1939)

With the end of the WWI, while workers from other parts of China had mostly returned to their places of origin, one thousand labourers from Qingtian chose to stay and resided in large numbers in areas surrounding Gare de Lyon train station. Their presence marked one of the earliest cores of Chinese community in Paris. It was also during this period that the size of Qingtianese diasporan community reached its first climax, with more than 30,000 people living in Europe and 42 other countries in the world.

Aside from Europe, Japan was also an ideal place for Qingtian people to earn a living in the late-19th and early 20th-century, due to its shorter distance and easier paperworks required. Demand for Chinese laborers surged with the booming of Japanese arms industry in the First World War, which in turn had attracted waves of immigrants from Wenzhou, Qingtian and other places to seek employment in the country. However, the Chinese community was dealt with a catastrophic blow when a major earthquake rocked Japan in September 1–8th, 1923, which was ensued by a bloody massacre against the Koreans and Chinese residing in the country. Among the 716 Chinese civilians that were either killed, injured, or declared missing, 161 of which were workers and traders of Qingtianese origin.

Situation for Chinese immigrants deteriorated with straining policies implemented by the Japanese government, around two thousand Qingtianese and Wenzhounese migrants were forcibly repatriated, and applications of a thousand others to enter Japan were rejected between February and April, 1924. Immigration ceased almost entirely after Japan's invasion of Manchuria in 1931.

Photo of the 40 Qingtianese men who converted to Catholicism in Isola del Gran Sasso concentration camp

The outbreak of World War II and the ensuing warfare, atrocities and displacements devastated the Qingtianese community in Europe. On September 27, 1940, Italy, which was under the rule of Fascist leader Benito Mussolini, formed the Axis Alliance with Germany and Japan and began to target the Chinese community in Italy, whose country of origin belonged to the Allied Powers. As a result of mass arrest taken by the Italian government, nearly 200 overseas Chinese from Qingtian were detained in the Isola del Gran Sasso internment camp located in the mountainous Abruzzo region of Southern Italy. According to the newspaper report of L'Osservatore Romano on August 4–5, 1941, 40 Chinese men in the internment camp converted to Catholicism on the same day under the persuasion of a Chinese Franciscan priest named Anthony Zhang Gangyi, and subsequently held the baptism ceremony in the church. At the end of 1943, the local anti-fascist guerrillas in Italy successfully liberated the town of Isola del Gran Sasso and freed the Chinese imprisoned in the internment camp.

After World War II, the United Nations Relief and Rehabilitation Administration and the Nationalist government carried out relief work for overseas Chinese victims of World War II, repatriating most of the overseas Chinese in Europe back to China. Due to the ruinous state of Europe and turbulent situation in China after the war, the number of overseas Chinese from Qingtian dwindled from more than 30,000 in the heyday of 1920s and 30s to less than 5,000 in 1949.

=== People's Republic and present era ===
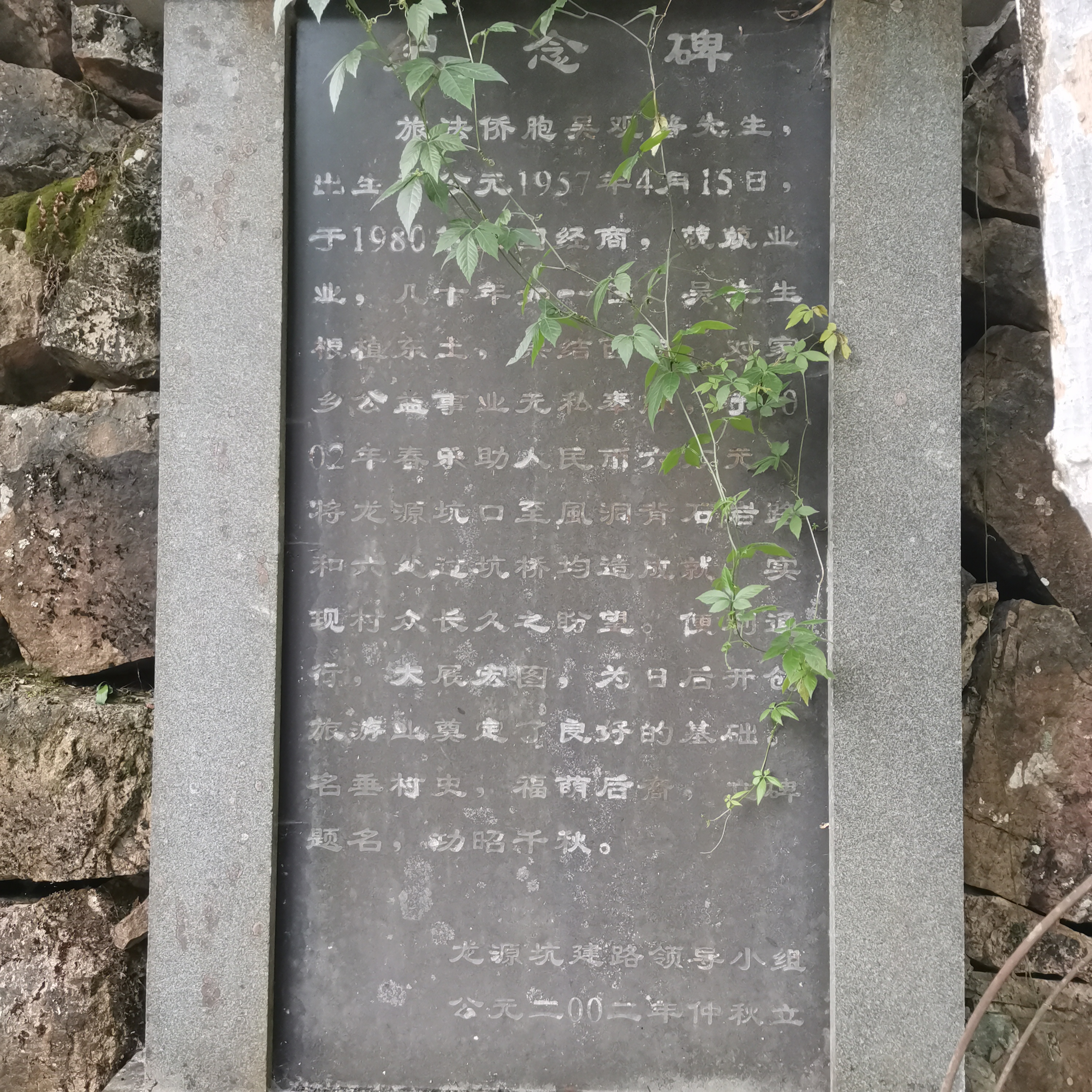
Monument with inscriptions dedicated to Wu Guanpu, a Qingtianese diaspora who left for France in 1980.

Between 1949 and 1978, under the international context of the Cold War, the government of the People's Republic of China implemented extremely strict regulations on the entry and exit of its citizens. As a result, the process of applying for permission to leave the country was difficult, in which only 752 people from Qingtian county were permitted to go abroad during this period, and the movement of Qingtian expatriates at home and abroad was at one point stagnant.

After China's reform and opening up in late 1970s, Qingtian experienced the third and also largest wave of emigration in its history. With the first decade of economic reform, 16,206 people in Qingtian county had obtained passports and were approved to go abroad, and from 1991 to 2000, a total of 117,476 people had left the country, and in 2000 alone the number reached 29,980.

Besides the traditional incentives of commercial opportunity and chain migration, the revival of Qingtianese emigration during this era was shaped also by local political circumstances in the aftermath of the Cultural Revolution. According to the The Mad Years: A Documentary Account of the Cultural Revolution in Qingtian, many people, majority of whom of rural descent and affiliated with the county's rebel faction known as "Qinggezong" (青革总) faced marginalisation in employment, education, and promotion during the post-Mao period, and that overseas migration became one route through which they sought new opportunities. Some later established businesses abroad and participated in return investment, hometown philanthropy, and overseas Chinese associations in Qingtian.

Since the late 1980s, the governments of Italy, Spain and France have repeatedly given amnesty for illegal immigrants. Relaxed immigration policy promoted the rapid growth of Qingtianese communities in these countries in recent decades. As of today, there are as many as 381,000 Qingtianese people currently residing in 146 countries across the world, forming the bulk of Chinese populations in many countries, especially in European states such as Spain where they constitute over 80% of the entire Chinese community.

== Impact ==
=== Influence on neighbouring regions ===
Topographic map of southern Zhejiang, with Qingtian and wider Wenzhou region visible along the Ou river valley

Apart from a few narrow coastal plains, southern Zhejiang is predominantly mountainous and hilly. The region's rugged terrain and limited resources historically made it difficult for local inhabitants to sustain their livelihoods through traditional agriculture. Meanwhile, early Qingtianese emigrants accumulated wealth through overseas businesses and subsequently invested in land and purchased property in neighbouring areas, including Yueqing, Rui'an and Pingyang, upon returning to China.

The visible prosperity of returning emigrants offered prospects for improving family circumstances and upward social mobility that were otherwise difficult to attain locally. Their experiences inspired residents within other parts of Qingtian and adjacent counties to seek opportunities abroad. Close geographical proximity, together with frequent social interactions and intermarriage between communities in Qingtian and the Wenzhou region, further facilitated the spread of migration networks. Over time, growing numbers of young people from these areas followed routes previously established by Qingtianese emigrants, contributing to the emergence of overseas Chinese communities in Wencheng, Rui'an and other parts of southern Zhejiang.

As emigration continued to expand throughout the twentieth century, Zhejiang became one of China's major sources of overseas Chinese emigration, alongside Guangdong, Fujian, Hainan, Guangxi and Yunnan. As of 2014, approximately 2.02 million people of Zhejiang origin were recorded worldwide, of whom more than one million were living in Europe.

== Legacies ==
=== Architecture ===
Nearly three hundred years of continuous contact with the world has profoundly influenced and changed the face of Qingtianese society. Aside from using the money they saved overseas to buy land and property, the returning Qingtianese also introduced Western architectural styles. They brought back building materials such as cement from abroad and integrated them with local brick and wood structures, leaving behind many private residences and public buildings with unique styles in the towns and villages of Qingtian. The Wu Family Mansion in Longxian Village, Fangshan Township, is a typical example of a diasporan architecture in Qingtian. It was built in 1930 by Wu Gankui, a renowned Qingtianese in Europe, in which the residence is a European-style building located against the mountain and by the water in line with the patterns of Feng Shui, with five rooms and three floors 14.62 meters in width, and 11 meters deep. The windows of the side rooms on both sides are mostly made of stained glass, retaining the aesthetics of a classic 1930s Qingtianese architecture with immense fusion of local and Western cultures.

Driven by the flourishing "diasporan economy" in the past three decades, a European architectural boom has also emerged in Hecheng, the seat of Qingtian. Located along the Oujiang River, the 1,770-meter-long Linjiang East Road (临江东路) is home to a great number of Baroque-style buildings, such as the Qingtian Library, the Kaiyuan Meitu Hotel, and the Overseas Chinese Hotel which was originally built in 1984 and has now been rebuilt and renovated. It has become a popular gathering place for the returning diasporans and tourists to relax and socialize.

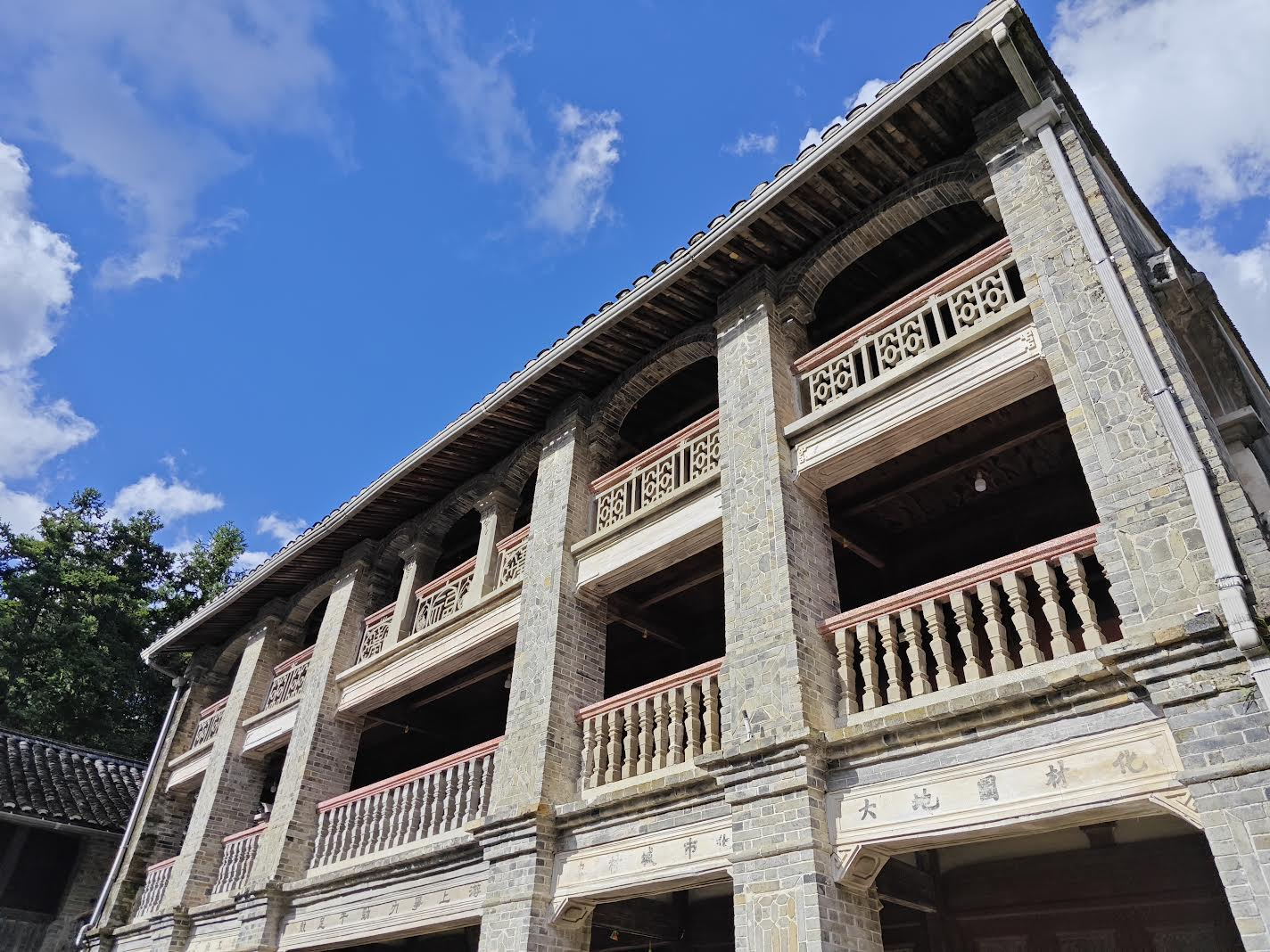
Mansion of Wu Qiankui, built in 1930

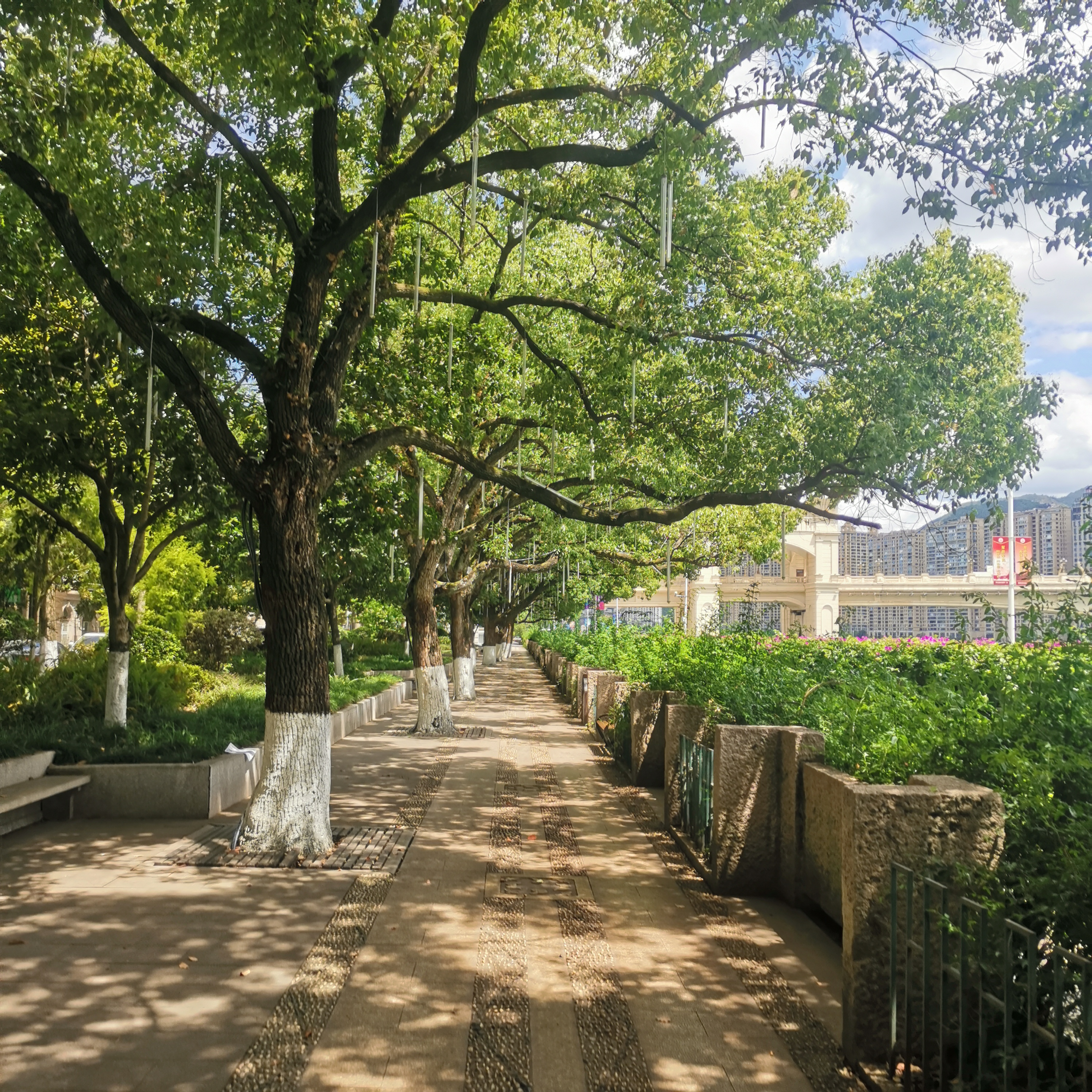
Longjin park (龙津公园), in the distance is the Jingyun Pedestrian Bridge (景云桥) built in European style

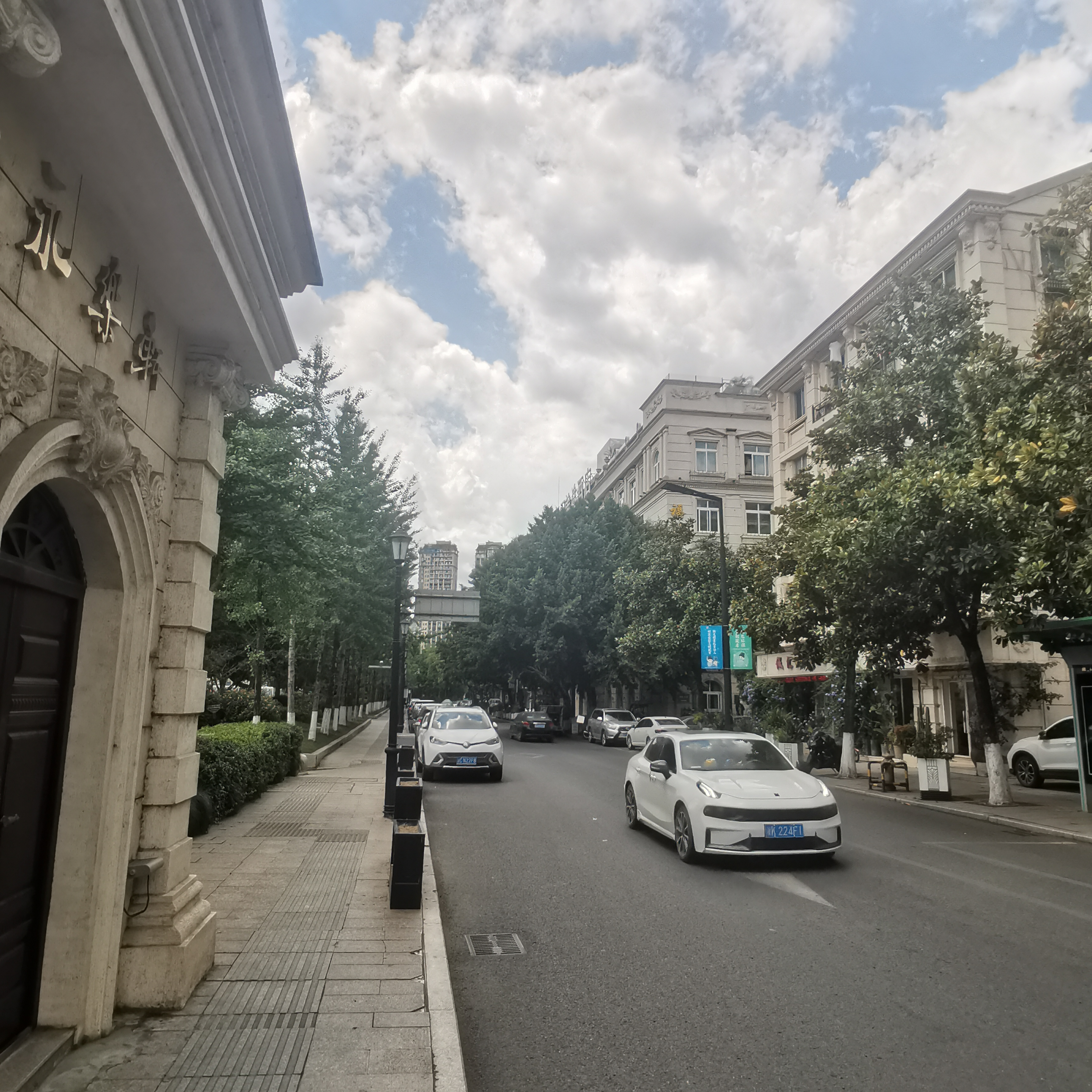
A view of Linjiang East Road

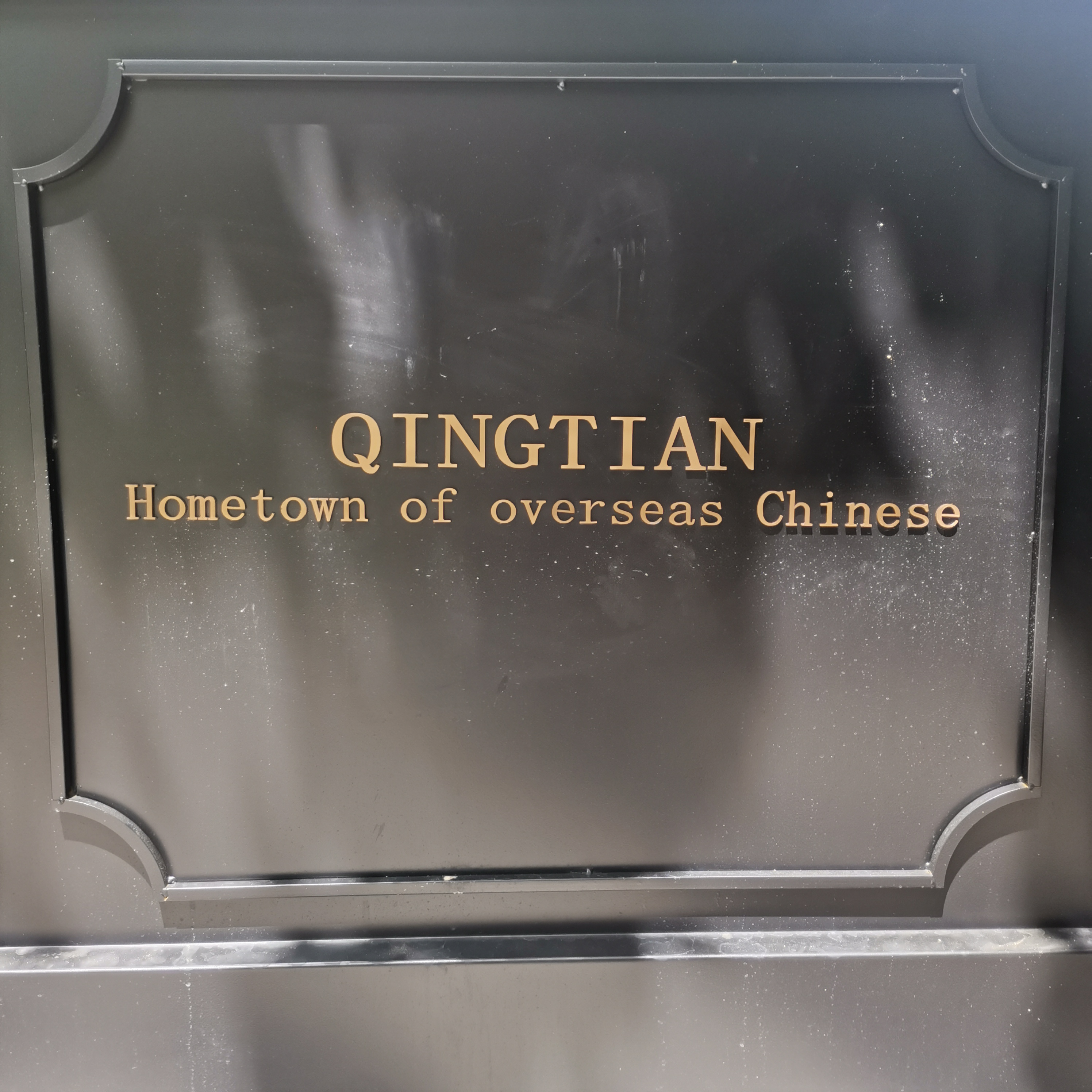
Street slogan "Qingtian: Hometown of Overseas Chinese" in English

=== Cuisines ===
Most of the early Qingtian immigrants who immigrated abroad started their careers in the catering industry. As a result, the Qingtianese have become an important medium for spreading Chinese cuisine overseas, especially in Europe, where Chinese restaurants run by Qingtianese account for half of the total. For example, in Austria, 7 out of every 10 Chinese restaurants are run by the Qingtianese.

While bringing their own cuisine and ingredients overseas, the Qingtianese around the world have also managed to master the culinary traditions of their host countries, and nurtured a burgeoning Western cuisine and coffee culture in Qingtian. In 1992, the first coffee house named "原乡人 Yuanxiangren" was opened for business in Qingtian. Since then, cafés and the habit of drinking coffee have sprung up throughout the county as batches of overseas Chinese left and returned. Today, there are as many 517 cafés across the county, with an annual coffee consumption of more than 100 tons and an average daily coffee consumption of nearly 20,000 cups, about 10 times the national average in China.

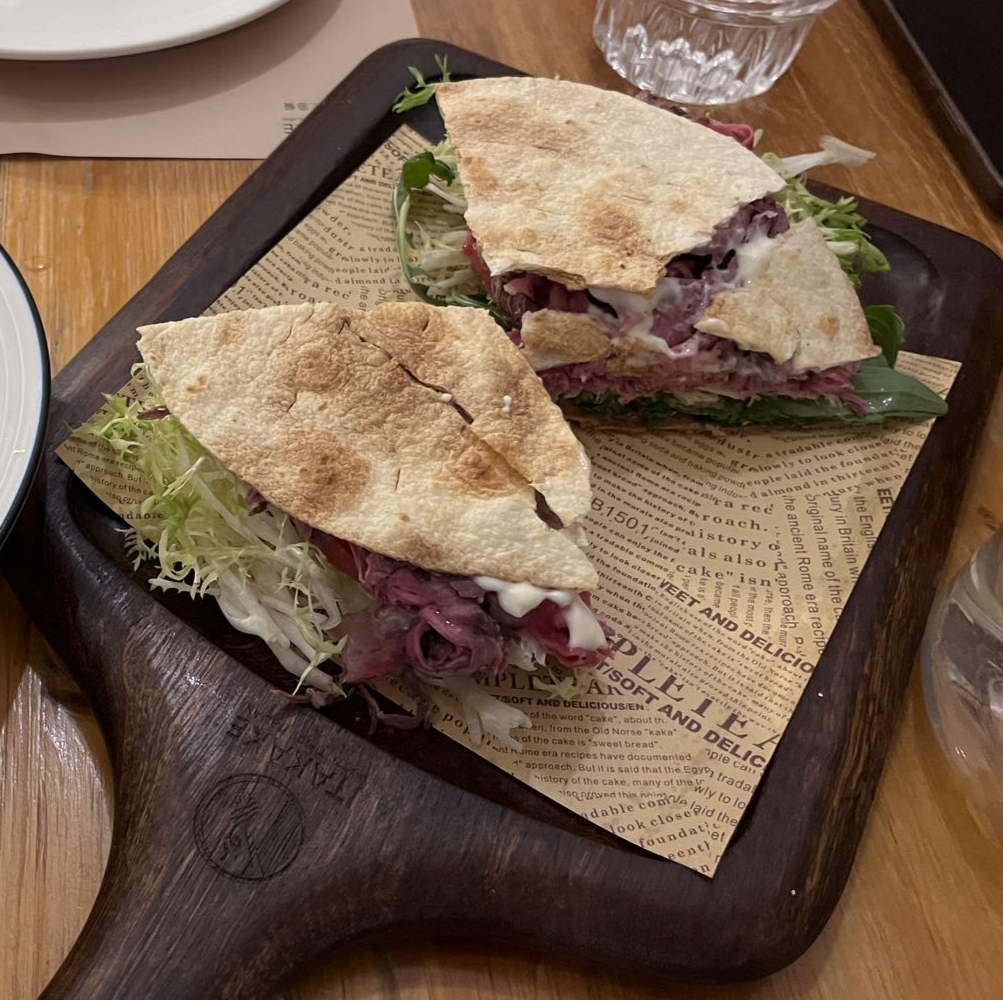
A plate of piadona romagnola served in Itakake, a Western-themed restaurant run by Qingtianese returnees from Italy

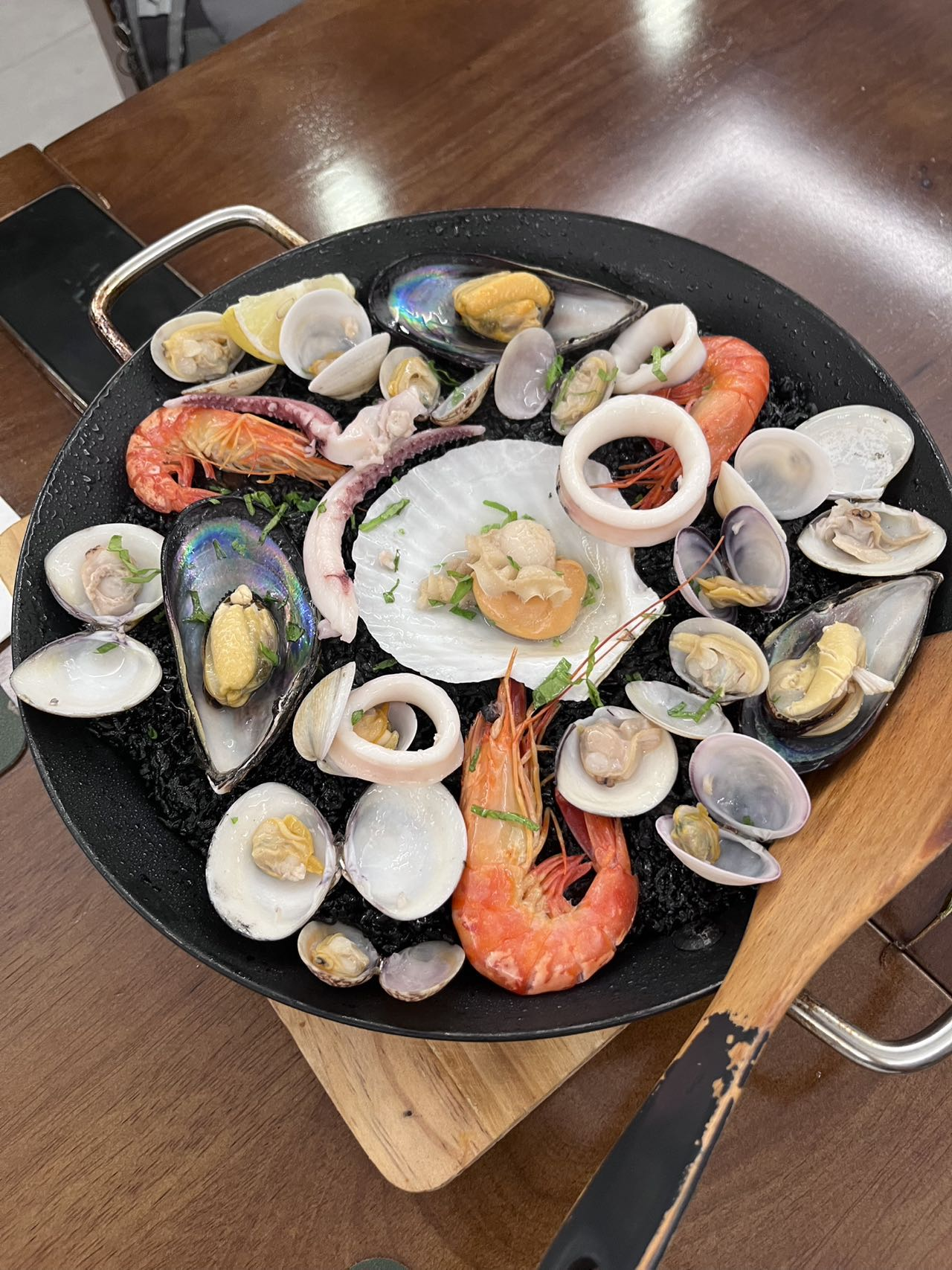
A seafood Paella prepared by Spanish Restaurant Carcia

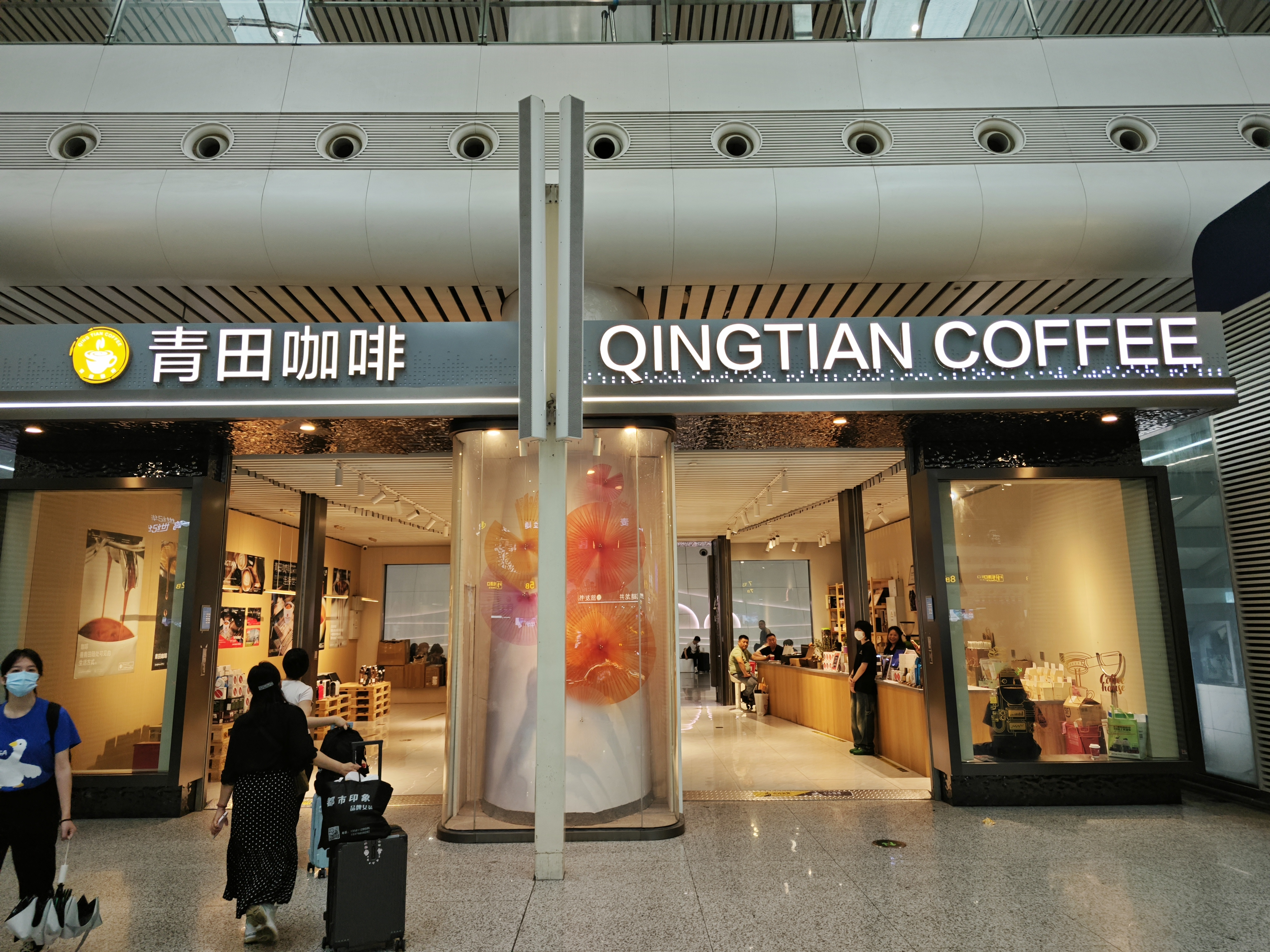
One of the branches of Qingtian Coffee in Hangzhou East Railway Station, China

== See also ==
- Overseas Chinese
- Chinese people in Italy
- Chinese people in Spain
- Chinese people in Germany
- Chinese diaspora in France
- Wenzhou people
- Fuzhou people
