= Chinese people in Spain =

Overseas ethnic group of Spain

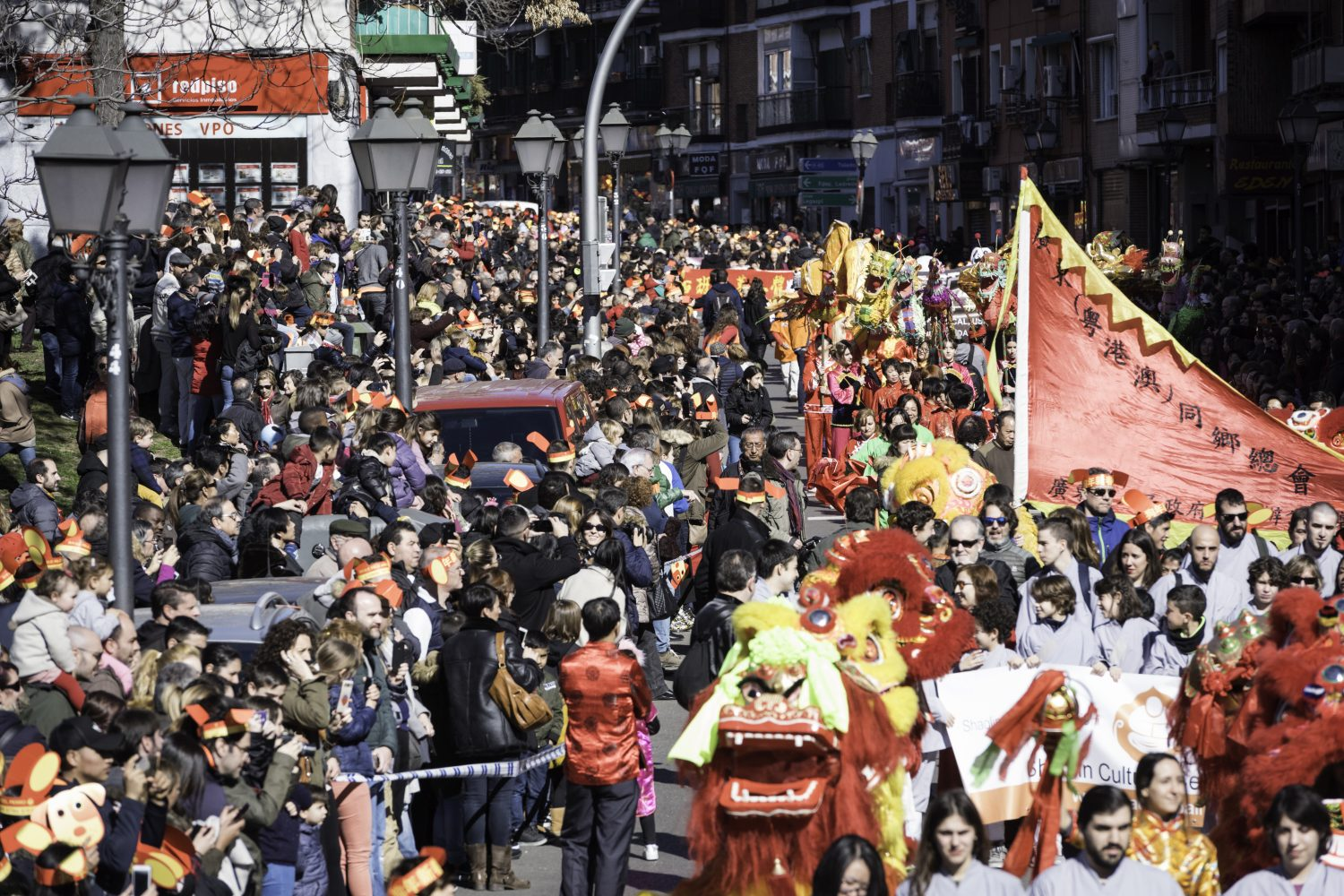
- Chinese New Year celebrations in Usera, 2018

Total population
- 199,341 / 223,999 (2022) (Note: 199,341 is the size of the population in Spain born in China (including those with Spanish citizenship). 223,999 is the size of the foreign population in Spain with Chinese citizenship (thus, with no Spanish citizenship).)

Regions with significant populations
- Madrid; Barcelona

Languages
- Cantonese; Wenzhounese; Qingtianese; Mandarin; Filipino; Cebuano; Spanish

Religion
- Buddhism; Taoism; Atheism; Irreligion; Christianity

Related ethnic groups
- Han Chinese; Chinese diaspora; Qingtianese diaspora

Chinese people in Spain form the ninth-largest non-European Union foreign community in Spain. As of 2022, official figures showed 223,999 Chinese citizens residing in Spain; however, this figure does not include people with origins in other overseas Chinese communities, nor Spanish citizens of Chinese origin or descent.

== History ==
The first recorded arrivals of Chinese people to Spain date from the late 16th century. Bernardino de Escalante in his Discurso de la navegación... (one of the first European books on China, published in 1577) says that among his sources of information were "Chinese themselves, who came to Spain" ("los mesmos naturales Chinas que an venido à España"). Juan González de Mendoza in his History of the great and mighty kingdom of China, wrote that in 1585 "three merchants of China" arrived in Mexico "and neuer staied till they came into Spaine and into other kingdomes further off."

A legal case was brought before the Council of the Indies involving two Chinese men in Seville, one a freeman, Esteban Cabrera, and the other a slave, Diego Indio, against Juan de Morales, Diego's owner. Diego called on Esteban to give evidence as a witness on his behalf. Diego recalled that he was taken as a slave by Francisco de Casteñeda from Mexico, to Nicaragua, then to Lima in Peru, then to Panama, and eventually to Spain via Lisbon, while he was still a boy. Esteban testified that he knew Diego as a boy in Limpoa (Liampó, the Portuguese name of Ningbo, a Chinese city in Zhejiang), which he claimed to be part of the Spanish colonial indies. This was a false claim since Liampo was not under Spanish rule, and it is speculated that Esteban and Diego lied about it in order to help Diego win his freedom, playing on the fact that the Spanish conducting the case were ignorant of Spain's Asian affairs. It worked in their favor and in July 1575 the Council issued a ruling siding with Diego. Juana de Castañeda also testified on behalf of Diego, claiming that she knew Diego in Lima and she also married Esteban during the ordeal. Juana was a native woman from Lima. Juana was around 40 years old when she testified on behalf of Diego in 1572. Another native woman from Panama, Isabel García also testified in favor of Diego, saying she knew him while he was in Panama. Esteban's will dated 15 March 1599 left his property to his daughter Francisca de Altamirana and her husband Miguel de la Cruz who was a tailor and probably Chinese like Esteban. A family of tailors was started by Esteban. Tristán de la China was taken as a slave by the Portuguese, while he was still a boy and in the 1520s was obtained by Cristobál de Haro in Lisbon, and taken to live in Seville and Valladolid. He was paid for his service as a translator on the 1525 Loaísa expedition, during which he was still an adolescent. The survivors, including Tristan, were shipwrecked for a decade until 1537 when they were returned to Lisbon by a Portuguese ship. Records from 7 May 1618 show that Hernando de los Ríos Coronel was permitted to bring from the Philippines to Spain two Chinese slaves, named Cosme and Juan de Terrenate, who was married to a woman named Manuela. Several Asians took advantage of laws requiring that the Spanish state pay for their return to their homeland after being trafficked to Spain illegally. A Chinese named Juan Castelindala Moreno petitioned to be sent home in 1632.

Asian slaves who were shipped from the Spanish Philippines in the Manila-Acapulco galleons to Acapulco in New Spain (Mexico) were all called "Chino" which meant Chinese, although in reality they were of diverse origins, including Japanese, Malays, Javanese, Timorese, and people from Bengal, India, Ceylon, Makassar, Tidore, Ternate, and Chinese. The people in this community of diverse Asians in Mexico were called "los indios chinos" by the Spanish. Most of these slaves were male and were obtained from Portuguese slave traders who obtained them from Portuguese colonial possessions and outposts of the Estado da India, which included parts of India, Bengal, Malacca, Indonesia, Nagasaki in Japan, and Macau. Some Spanish temporarily brought some of these Chino slaves to Spain itself from Mexico, where owning and showing off a Chino slave showed high class since Spanish aristocrats viewed their Chino slaves as fascinating trendy symbols of class. A Spanish woman, Doña María de Quesada y Figueroa, in New Spain owned a China born Chinese man called Manuel who before being enslaved to her was taken from New Spain to be shown off in Seville until he was transferred to her ownership to be used by her as a slave by the woman's son Doctor D. Juan de Quesada in 1621. Records of three Japanese slaves dating from the 16th century, named Gaspar Fernandes, Miguel and Ventura who ended up in Mexico showed that they were purchased by Portuguese slave traders in Japan, brought to Manila from where they were shipped to Mexico by their owner Perez. Some of these Asian slaves were also brought to Lima in Peru, where there was a small community of Asians including Chinese, Japanese, and Malays.

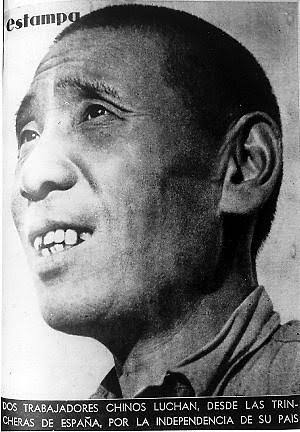
Portrait of Zhang Ruishu, a Chinese volunteering as paramedic for the International Brigades on "Estampa" magazine, 1938

The first large wave of Chinese immigrants came to Spain in the 1920s and 1930s, working as itinerant peddlers. During the Spanish Civil War (1936-1939), a small but notable number of Chinese fought in the conflict as part of the foreign volunteers supporting the Republican side. Historical research suggests that twenty or so Chinese volunteers served within the International Brigades. Among them was Dong Hong Yick (陈文饶), who was killed in action at Gandesa in 1938. After World War II, they branched out into the restaurant industry, and later into textiles and trade. However, the vast majority of Chinese residents in Spain started arriving in the country around the 1980s. According to Xu Songhua, president of the Association of Chinese in Spain (Asociación de Chinos en España), established in 1985, there are 13,000 Chinese-owned businesses in Spain, including 4,000 restaurants, 3,200 "dollar shops", 1,500 fruit shops, 600 wholesale warehouses, 80 Chinese groceries, 200 textile factories, and 120 photo processing shops. Nowadays, Madrid and Barcelona are home to the largest Chinese communities of Spain. Unlike earlier waves of Chinese immigrants in other countries, over 80% of the Chinese in Spain come from Zhejiang's Qingtian County, with smaller numbers from Guangdong and Fujian. Others have come from Hong Kong, Macau, and Chinese communities of Southeast Asia, Latin America, and Europe.

== Demography ==
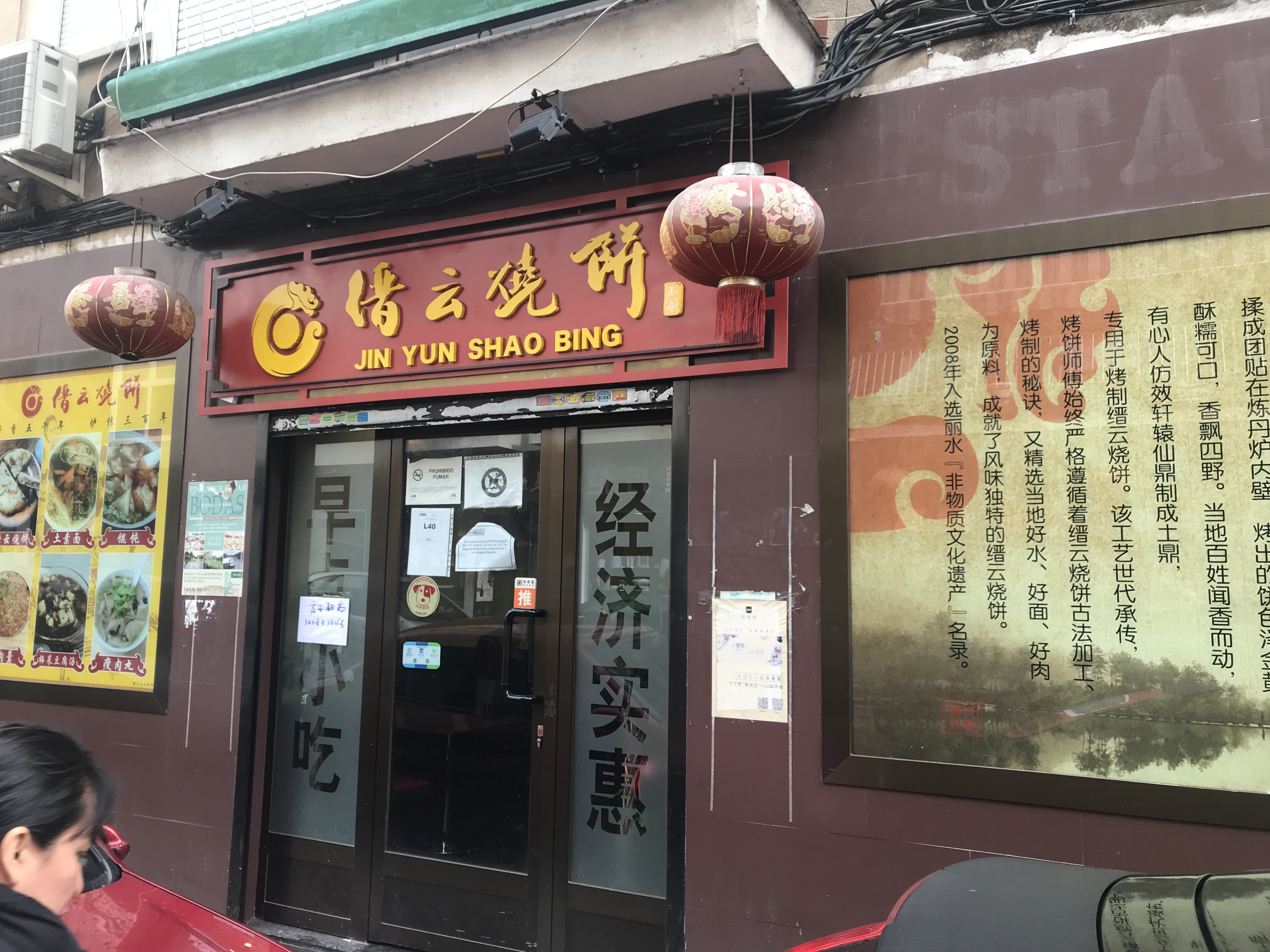
A Chinese restaurant in Usera, the "Chinatown" district of Madrid

The age structure of Chinese in Spain is skewed very young; 2003 figures showed only 1.8% aged 65 or older, compared to 7% of the People's Republic of China's population and 17.5% of Spain's, while over 17% were under the age of 15. As a result of the small proportion of elderly, combined with long working hours and the illegal status of some, Chinese are reported to use medical services at a far lower rate than other ethnic groups in Spain.

=== Foreign population of Chinese citizenship in Spain ===
Vertical bar chart of foreign population of Chinese nationality in Spain between 2003 and 2022
Population (1998-2017) Foreign population in Spain of Chinese nationality according to the Instituto Nacional de Estadística.

=== Religion ===
A Taoist temple was opened in 2014 by the Chinese community of Barcelona, led by Taoist priest Liu Zemin, a 21st-generation descendant of poet, soldier and prophet Liu Bowen (1311-1375). The temple, located in the district of Sant Martí and inaugurated with the presence of the People's Republic of China consul Qu Chengwu, enshrines 28 deities of the province of China where most of the Chinese in Barcelona come from.

== Victimization ==
In September 2004, protests in Elche over cheap imported shoes from China undercutting local shoe markets resulted in the burning of a Chinese-owned shoe warehouse. Crime is a problem in the Chinese community due to the triads, which are involved in human trafficking and extortion of Chinese business owners. However, the Triads have not established themselves as drug distributors due to competition from other groups.

== Notable people ==
- He Zhiwen, world-ranked male table tennis player (Originally from Zhejiang, China)
- Shen Yanfei, world-ranked female table tennis player (Originally from Hebei, China)

== See also ==
- China–Spain relations
- Demographics of Spain
- Qingtianese diaspora
