= China–Spain relations =

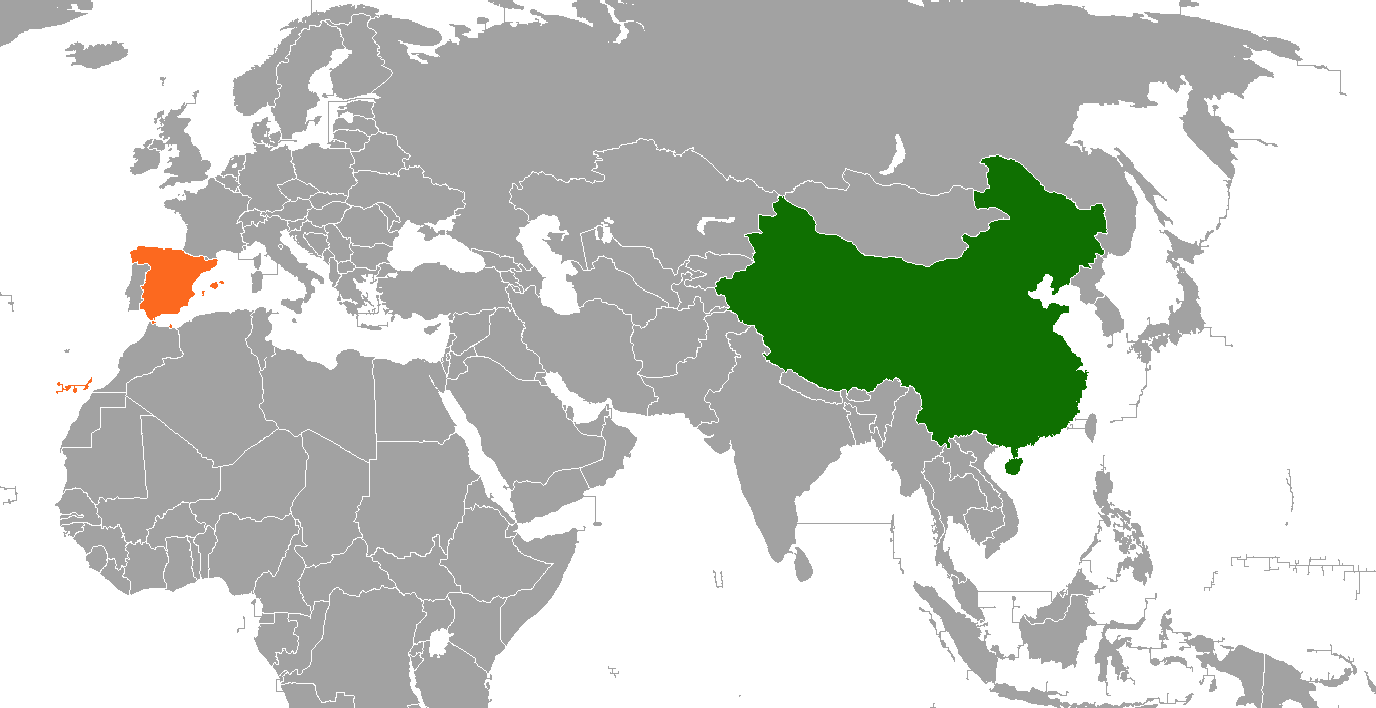
- China: Spain

China–Spain relations have existed since the 16th century. In modern times, official diplomatic relations between Spain and the People's Republic of China were established in 1973.

== History ==
Contact between China and Spain first occurred between the Ming dynasty of China and the Spanish-ruled Philippines, in which Spain believed it could take over China.

When the Chinese pirate Limahong attacked Manila in 1574, officials in Fujian Province were willing to let the Spanish establish a trade port on an island south of Xiamen, in return for Limahong's capture. However, the governor of the Philippines did not respond favourably, and the offer came to nothing when Limahong escaped from Manila.

In 1598, Cantonese officials allowed Spain to trade in El Piñal, a port in the Pearl River Delta near Macau. The Portuguese in Macau reacted violently and chased away the Spanish from the area by arms in 1600.

In 1927, a treaty recognizing extraterritoriality was signed between the Kingdom of Spain and Chiang Kai-shek's Nationalist government. The Spanish consul general in Shanghai was also the minister plenipotentiary to China. The Republic of China had diplomatic relations with Spain after Francisco Franco seized power.

Francoist Spain's official diplomatic relations with the People's Republic of China began in March 1973.

== Bilateral relations ==
According to the Chinese state-run Xinhua News Agency, the volume of trade between the two countries grew considerably in the 2000s. Total trade, at US$7.2 billion in 2004, had increased to $22.7 billion by October 2008, and China became Spain's sixth-largest trading partner.

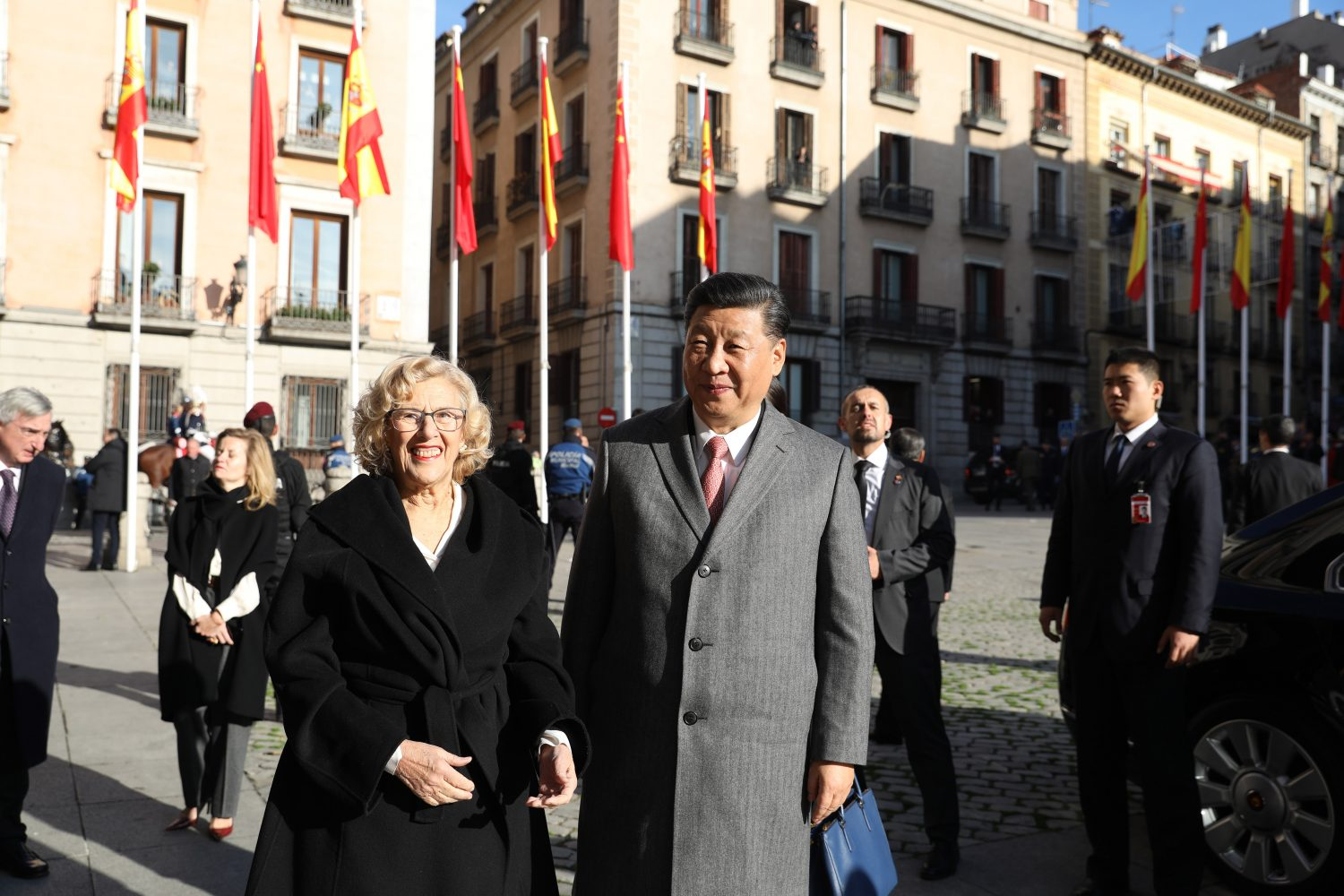
Manuela Carmena and Xi Jinping during the latter's visit to Madrid in 2018

In 2018, during General Secretary of the Chinese Communist Party Xi Jinping's state visit to Spain, Prime Minister Pedro Sánchez refused to sign a memorandum of understanding on the Belt and Road Initiative.

In June 2019, Spain had extradited 94 Taiwanese nationals to mainland China instead of Taiwan as part of "Operation Great Wall". By 2021, the number had increased to more than 200. Both countries signed an extradition agreement in 2006.

In July 2019, the UN ambassadors from 22 nations, including Spain, signed a joint letter to the UNHRC condemning China's alleged mistreatment of the Uyghurs as well as of other minority groups and urged the Chinese government to close the Xinjiang re-education camps.

The International Department of the Chinese Communist Party maintains relations with major Spanish political parties Spanish Socialist Workers' Party (PSOE) and the People's Party. Vox has maintained a critical stance toward the Chinese government.

During the COVID-19 pandemic, it was reported in April 2020 that 640,000 Antigen Coronavirus Test Kits which themselves were replacements for previously supplied faulty kits, bought from a Chinese company, Bioeasy, had been found to be defective, prompting Spain to seek a refund. The Spanish Health Ministry reported that faulty face masks bought from another Chinese company, Garry Galaxy, had resulted in infections among health workers, requiring the isolation of over a thousand Spanish healthcare personnel.

In September 2024, Spanish Prime Minister Pedro Sánchez held talks with Chinese leader Xi Jinping to enhance bilateral relations, focusing on global conflicts of Ukraine and economic cooperation. The discussions addressed trade disputes, such as EU tariffs on Chinese electric vehicles and Spain's pork exports, while also emphasizing the importance of strengthening business and cultural ties between the two nations.

In July 2025, the European Union raised cybersecurity concerns as the Spanish government contracts with Huawei to manage and store its wiretaps for law enforcement and intelligence services.

== Resident diplomatic missions ==
of China in Spain

- Madrid (Embassy)
- Barcelona (Consulate-General)

of Spain in China

- Beijing (Embassy)
- Chengdu (Consulate-General)
- Guangzhou (Consulate-General)
- Hong Kong (Consulate-General)
- Shanghai (Consulate-General)

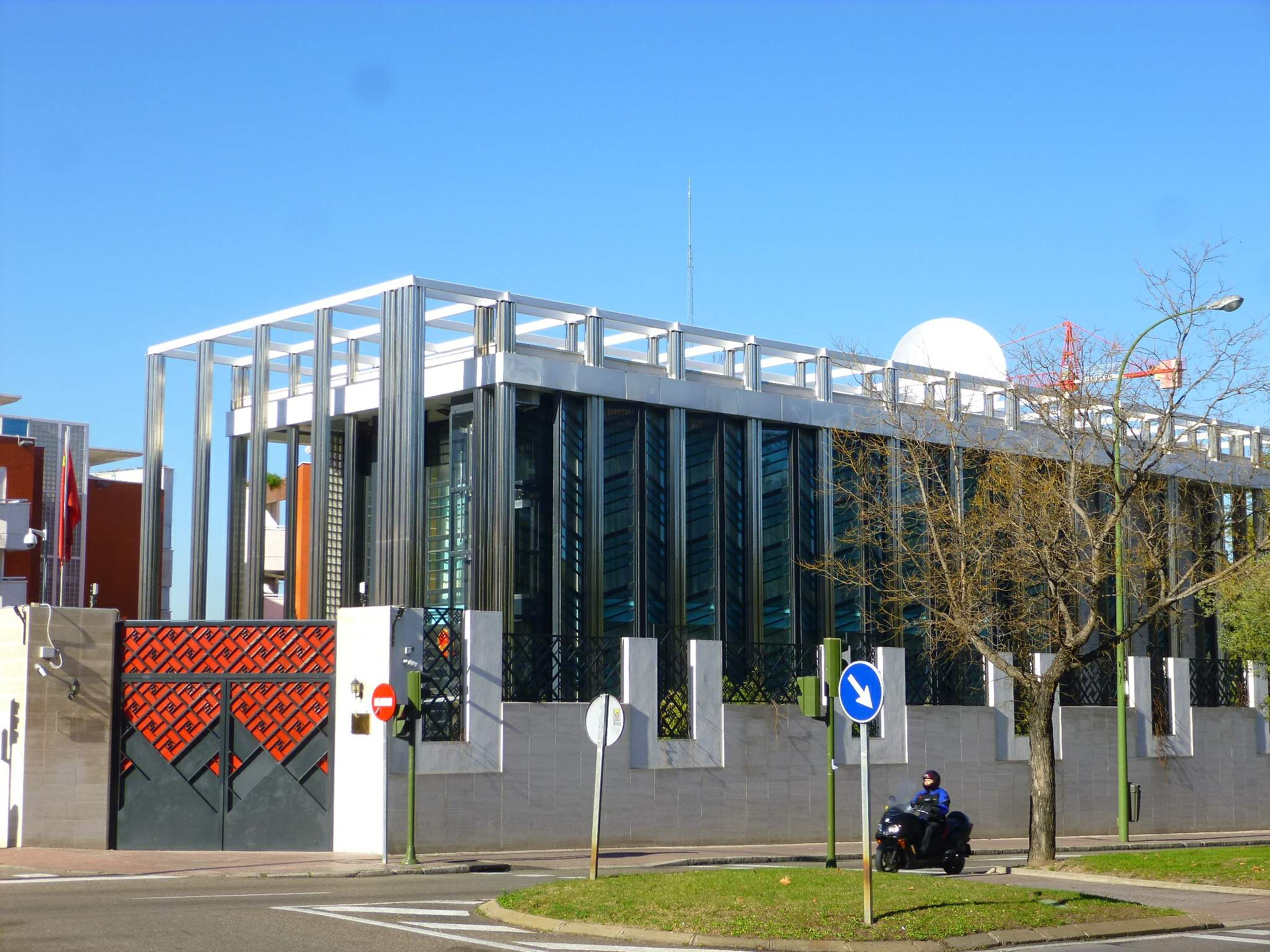
Embassy of China in Madrid

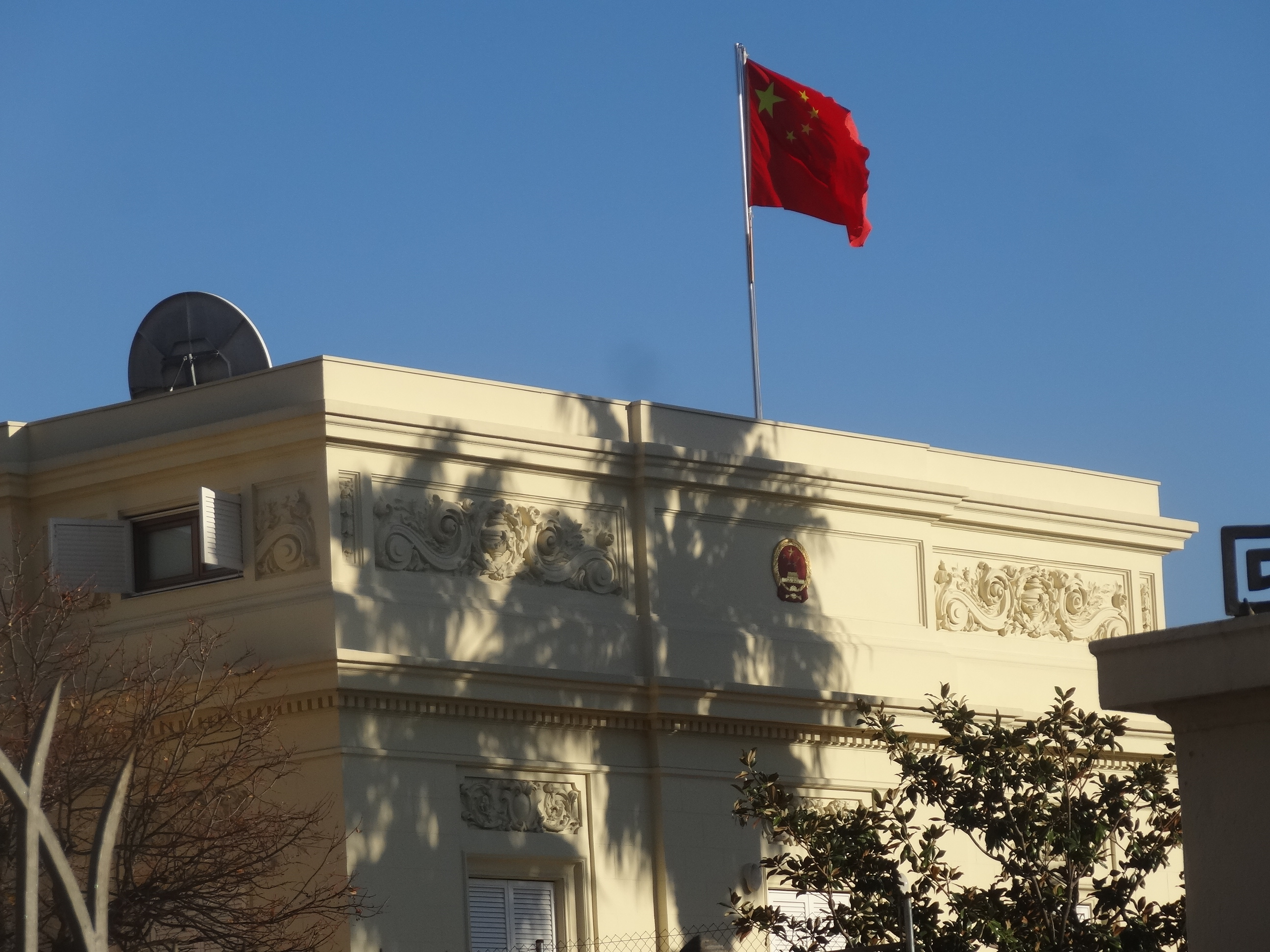
Consulate-General of China in Barcelona

== Public opinion ==
A survey published in 2026 by the Pew Research Center found that 54% of Spaniards had a favorable view of China, while 39% had an unfavorable view. It also found that 65% of Spaniards in the 18-35 age group had positive opinions of China.

== See also ==
- Foreign relations of China
- Foreign relations of Spain
- Chinese people in Spain
