= Chinese people in Serbia =

Ethnic group

Кинези у Србији 塞爾維亞華人

Total population
- 1,470 (2022) 14,500 Chinese citizens (est.)

Regions with significant populations
- Belgrade, Bor, Zrenjanin

Languages
- Mandarin, Qingtian dialect, Wenzhou dialect, Fuzhou dialect, and Serbian

Religion
- Predominately irreligious; Chinese Buddhism, Chinese traditional religion

Related ethnic groups
- Overseas Chinese, Qingtianese diaspora, Wenzhou people, Fuzhou people

Chinese people in Serbia are mostly expatriates from China. According to data from the 2022 census, there were 1,470 Chinese people in Serbia. The community is mainly concentrated in Serbia's capital, Belgrade (mostly immigrants from the late 1990s) and in towns of Bor and Zrenjanin (recent immigration largely tied to investments of Chinese companies in mining and manufacturing).

== History ==
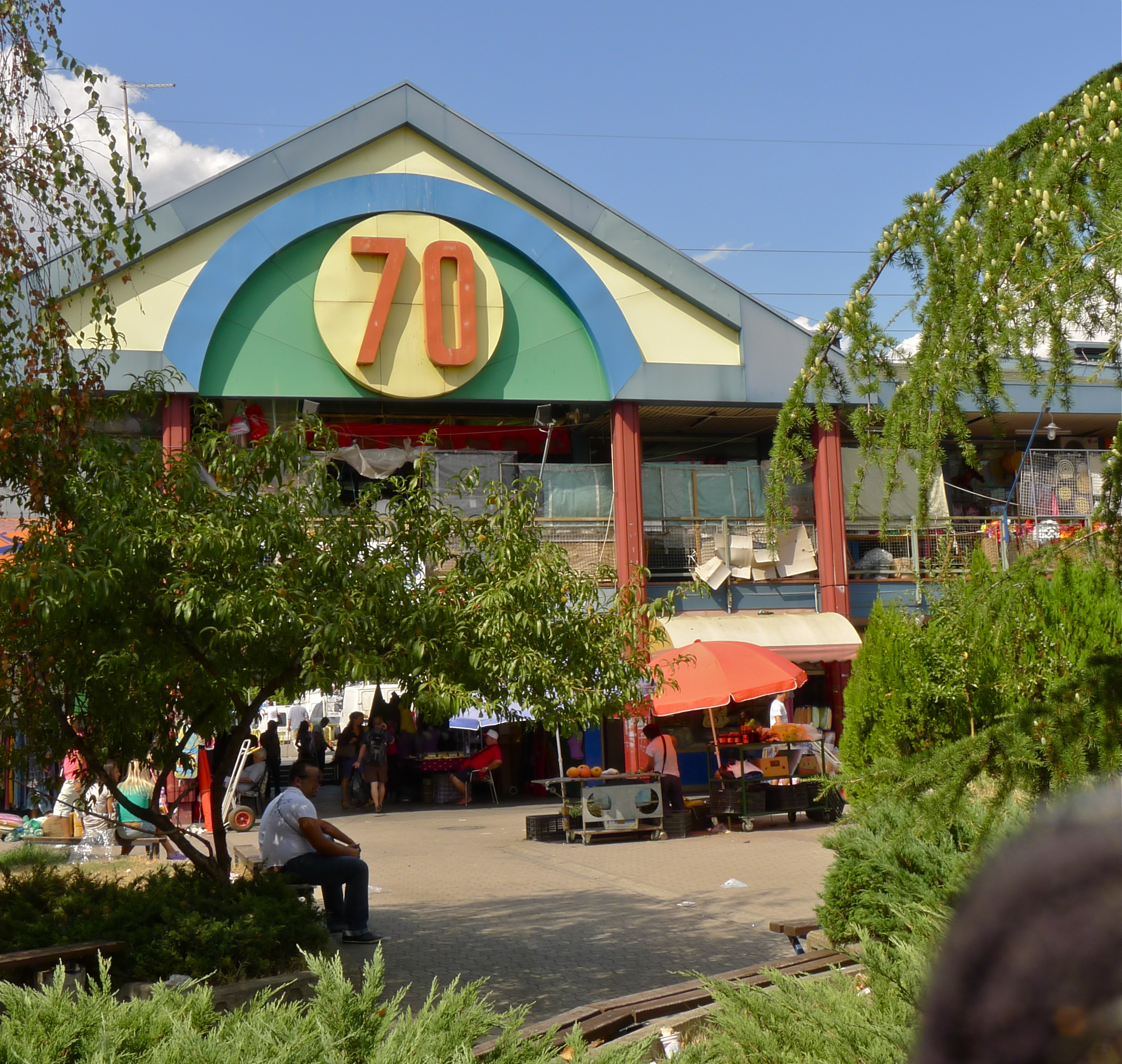
Chinese commercial center in Belgrade's neighborhood Blok 70, known for large Chinese presence

The first wave of Chinese immigration to Serbia occurred during the late 1990s and was driven by relaxed visa policies. The first larger groups of Chinese migrants settled in Serbia in the late 1990s, moving southward after unfavorable changes in Hungary's visa requirements. They were mostly traders originating from China's southern provinces, Zhejiang and Fujian, operating transnational businesses (distributing goods across the Balkans) and living in relatively isolated communities. The Serbian daily newspaper, Večernje novosti, reported that one part of Belgrade in particular has had a complete Chinese village transplanted into it: "the entire population of the Chinese village of Jincun, Kaihua County of Zhejiang province, has moved to Belgrade, specifically to Blok 70 neighborhood in New Belgrade where they have businesses in the local center (Kineski centar, "Chinese center")."

In recent years, the second wave of Chinese in Serbia came but it was rather due to mobility than migration. Chinese investment projects brought about a new migration wave, with fixed-term migrants moving to Serbia, including manual laborers and mid- and upper-management. This is the first time that Chinese construction workers have migrated to a European country in such numbers and under interstate agreements, marking a shift from Chinese labor that has been present in Europe in the form of catering work or garment workshops, both often illegal and invisible. Recent Chinese presence to the towns of Zrenjanin and Bor is driven by major industrial projects like the Linglong Tire factory in Zrenjanin and Zijin Mining's copper mining complex in Bor. While Zrenjanin sees a more project-specific, transient workforce, Bor hosts a larger, more visible Chinese community, raising social concerns among locals. The lack of integration has sparked tensions, evident primarily in social media sentiment.

== See also ==
- Immigration to Serbia
- Overseas Chinese
- China–Serbia relations
