= Chinese people in Portugal =

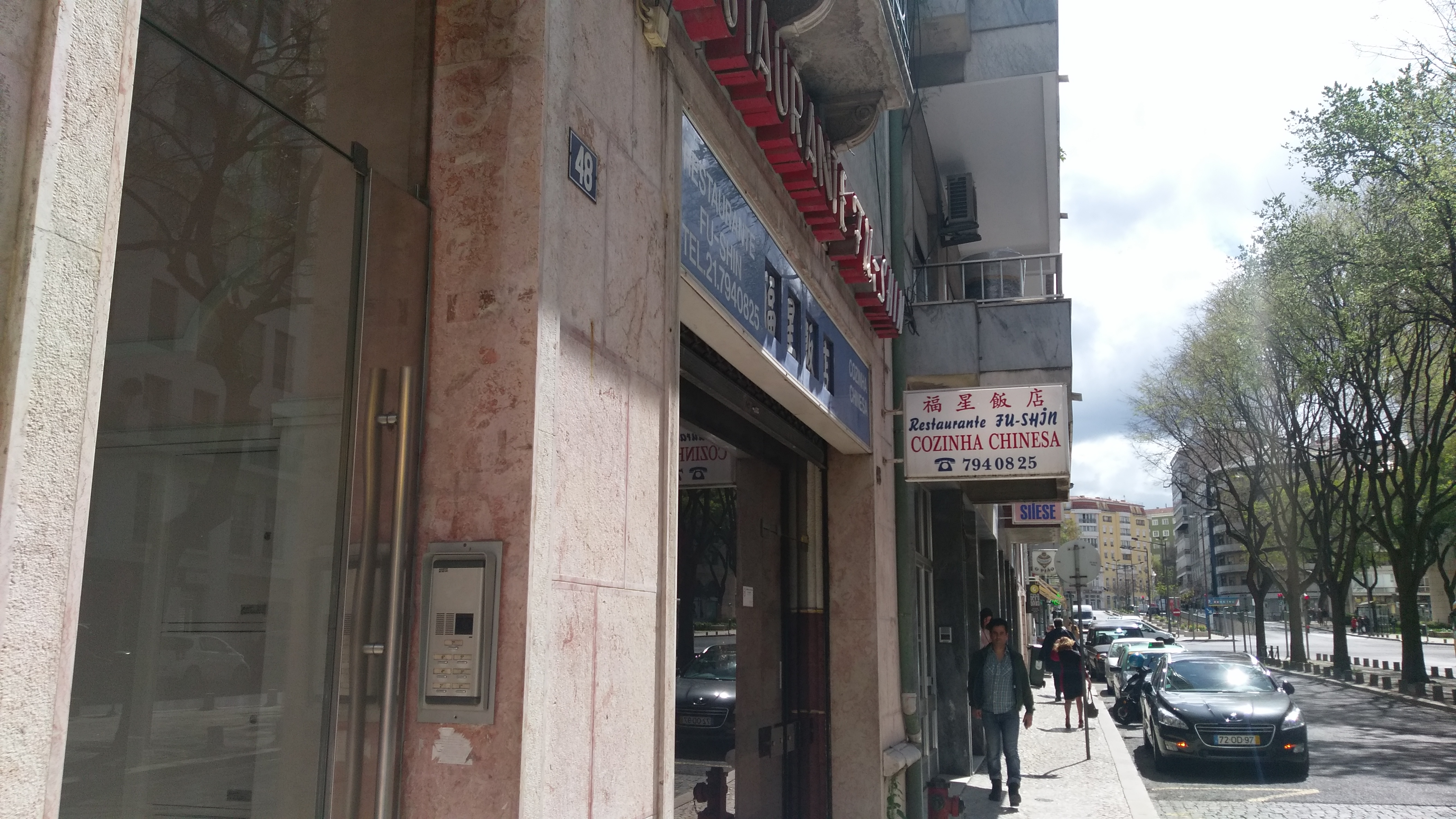
- Chinese restaurant in Lisbon

Total population
- 26,074 (2020); Includes foreign citizens only

Regions with significant populations
- Lisbon

Languages
- Chinese (primarily Wenzhounese and Mandarin among recent arrivals; Cantonese among established migrants), Macanese Patois, Portuguese

Religion
- Mahayana Buddhism

Related ethnic groups
- Ethnic Chinese in Mozambique, other overseas Chinese groups

Chinese people in Portugal

Chinese name
- Traditional Chinese: 葡萄牙華人
- Simplified Chinese: 葡萄牙华人
Transcriptions
Standard Mandarin
- Hanyu Pinyin: Pútáoyá Huárén
Wu
- Romanization: Phu-toh-ngaa-gho-nin
Yue: Cantonese
- Yale Romanization: pòuh tòuh ngàh wàh yàhn
- Jyutping: pou4 tou4 ngaa4 waa4 jan4

Portuguese name
- Portuguese: Chineses em Portugal

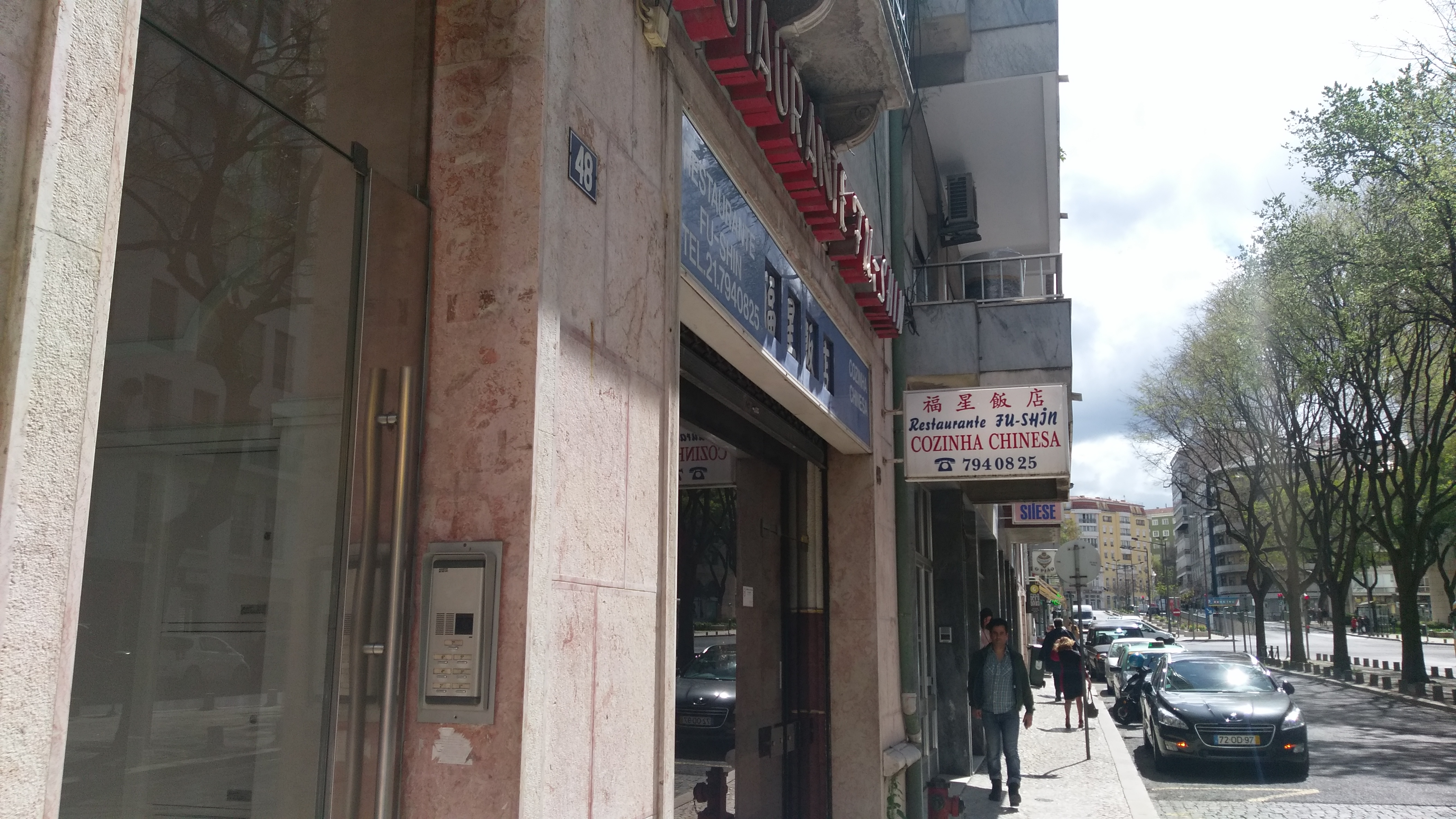
Chinese restaurant in Lisbon

Chinese people in Portugal (Chinese: 葡萄牙華人, Cantonese Yale: pòuh tòuh ngàh wàh yàhn) form the country's largest Asian community, and the twelfth-largest foreign community overall. Despite forming only a small part of the overseas Chinese population in Europe, the Chinese community in Portugal is one of the continent's oldest due to the country's colonial and trade history with Macau dating back to the 16th century. There are about 30,000 people of Chinese descent residing in Portugal.

== Migration history ==
=== Early history ===
Some Chinese slaves in Spain ended up there after being taken to Lisbon in Portugal and sold when they were young. Tristán de la China was a Chinese boy who was taken as a slave by the Portuguese, while he was still a boy. In the 1520s, he was bought by Cristobál de Haro in Lisbon and was taken to live in Seville and Valladolid. He was paid for his service as a translator on the 1525 Loaísa expedition, during which he was still an adolescent. The survivors, including Tristan, were shipwrecked for a decade until 1537 when they were taken back by a Portuguese ship to Lisbon.

There are records of Chinese slaves in Lisbon in 1540. A Chinese scholar, apparently enslaved by Portuguese raiders somewhere on the southern China coast, was brought to Portugal around 1549. Purchased by João de Barros, he worked with the Portuguese historian on translating Chinese texts into Portuguese.

In sixteenth century southern Portugal there were Chinese slaves but the number of them was described as "negligible", being outnumbered by East Indian, Mourisco, and African slaves. Amerindians, Chinese, Malays, and Indians were slaves in Portugal but in far fewer number than Turks, Berbers, and Arabs. China and Malacca were origins of slaves delivered to Portugal by Portuguese viceroys. A testament from 23 October 1562 recorded a Chinese man named António who was enslaved and owned by a Portuguese woman, Dona Maria de Vilhena, a wealthy noblewoman in Évora. In Evora, António was among the three most common male names given to male slaves. D. Maria owned one of the only two Chinese slaves in Evora and she used him from among the slaves she owned to drive her mules for her because he was Chinese since rigorous and demanding tasks were assigned to Mourisco, Chinese, and Indian slaves. D. Maria's owning a Chinese among her fifteen slaves reflected on her high social status, since Chinese, Mouriscos, and Indians were among the ethnicities of prized slaves and were much more expensive compared to blacks, so high class individuals owned these ethnicities and it was because her husband Simão was involved in the slave trade in the east that she owned slaves of many different ethnicities. When she died, D. Maria freed this Chinese man in her testament along with several other slaves, leaving him with 10,000 réis in money. D. Maria de Vilhena was the daughter of the nobleman and explorer Sancho de Tovar, the capitão of Sofala (List of colonial governors of Mozambique), and she was married twice, the first marriage to the explorer Cristóvão de Mendonça, and her second marriage was to Simão da Silveira, capitão of Diu (Lista de governadores, capitães e castelões de Diu). D. Maria was left a widow by Simão, and she was a major slave owner, possessing the most slaves in Évora, with her testament recording fifteen slaves.

A legal case was brought before the Spanish Council of the Indies in the 1570s, involving two Chinese men in Seville, one of them a freeman, Esteban Cabrera, and the other a slave, Diego Indio, against Juan de Morales, Diego's owner. Diego called on Esteban to give evidence as a witness on his behalf. Diego recalled that he was taken as a slave by Francisco de Casteñeda from Mexico, to Nicaragua, then to Lima in Peru, then to Panama, and eventually to Spain via Lisbon, while he was still a boy.

After the Portuguese first made contact with Japan in 1543, a large scale slave trade developed in which Portuguese purchased Japanese as slaves in Japan and sold them to various locations overseas, including Portugal itself, throughout the sixteenth and seventeenth centuries. Many documents mention the large slave trade along with protests against the enslavement of Japanese. Japanese slaves are believed to be the first of their nation to end up in Europe, and the Portuguese purchased large numbers of Japanese slave girls to bring to Portugal for sexual purposes, as noted by the Church in 1555. King Sebastian feared that it was having a negative effect on Catholic proselytization since the slave trade in Japanese was growing to massive proportions, so he commanded that it be banned in 1571 Some Korean slaves were bought by the Portuguese and brought back to Portugal from Japan, where they had been among the tens of thousands of Korean prisoners of war transported to Japan during the Japanese invasions of Korea (1592–98). Historians pointed out that at the same time Hideyoshi expressed his indignation and outrage at the Portuguese trade in Japanese slaves, he himself was engaging in a mass slave trade of Korean prisoners of war in Japan. Chinese were bought in large numbers as slaves by the Portuguese in the 1520s. Japanese Christian Daimyos were mainly responsible for selling to the Portuguese their fellow Japanese. Japanese women and Japanese men, Javanese, Chinese, and Indians were all sold as slaves in Portugal.

Chinese boys were kidnapped from Macau and sold as slaves in Lisbon while they were still children. Brazil imported some of Lisbon's Chinese slaves. Fillippo Sassetti saw some Chinese and Japanese slaves in Lisbon among the large slave community in 1578, although most of the slaves were blacks. Brazil and Portugal were both recipients of Chinese slaves bought by Portuguese. Portugal exported to Brazil some Chinese slaves. Military, religious, and civil service secretarial work and other lenient and light jobs were given to Chinese slaves while hard labor was given to Africans. Only African slaves in 1578 Lisbon outnumbered the large numbers of Japanese and Chinese slaves in the same city. Some of the Chinese slaves were sold in Brazil, a Portuguese colony. Cooking was the main profession of Chinese slaves around 1580 in Lisbon according to Fillippo Sassetti from Florence and they were viewed as "hard working", "intelligent", and "loyal" by the Portuguese.

The Portuguese also valued Oriental slaves more than the black Africans and the Moors for their rarity. Chinese slaves were more expensive than Moors and blacks and showed off the high status of the owner The Portuguese attributed qualities like intelligence and industriousness to Chinese slaves. Traits such as high intelligence were ascribed to Chinese, Japanese and Indian slaves.

In 1595 a law was passed banning the selling and buying of Chinese and Japanese slaves due to hostility from the Chinese and Japanese regarding the trafficking in Japanese and Chinese slaves On 19 February 1624, the King of Portugal forbade the enslavement of Chinese people of either sex.

=== 20th century to present day ===
Small communities of Chinese people formed in Portugal in the mid-20th century. Following World War II, an influx of Macanese people (those of mixed Portuguese and often Chinese heritage from the colony of Macau) began settling in Portugal in significant numbers. This was most prominent in 1975, when the Portuguese military withdrew much of its presence from Macau and Macanese and local Chinese families with ties to the military immigrated to Portugal. Ethnic Chinese intending to work in the colonial Macau government also arrived in Portugal during this time to study or train for their positions.

Some members of the Chinese community in Mozambique also moved to Portugal as the process of decolonisation in Mozambique began in the 1970s and its independence drew near. However, mass Chinese migration to Portugal did not begin until the 1980s; the new migrants came primarily from Zhejiang, with some from Macau as well. As the number of migrants continued to grow, social institutions formed in order to serve the Chinese community. Nevertheless, the nature of the institutions differed according to migrant groups. Established migrants and recent arrivals from Macau, along with Chinese from Mozambique, were already familiar with the Portuguese language and culture and formed community associations and a Chinese language newspaper to better assist newer immigrants in adjusting to a new life in Portugal. Meanwhile, among arrivals from mainland China, informal social networks headed by earlier arrivals helped newer immigrants in employment needs, often under established Chinese migrant entrepreneurs.

There were expectations that the 1999 transfer of sovereignty over Macau back to the People's Republic of China would result in as many as 100,000 Chinese migrants from Macau settling in Portugal. Between 1985 and 1996, 5,853 Chinese acquired Portuguese nationality; however, most of these were residents of Macau and did not reside in Portugal or migrate there later. Prior to the 1999 transfer of sovereignty over Macau, some Chinese triad members from Macau also married Portuguese prostitutes.

=== Asian DNA in the Azores ===
None of the mainland Portuguese population has E3a and N3, but 1.2% of the Azores population has the sub-Saharan African Y Chromosome E3a Haplogroup while 0.6% of the Azores population has the Asian Y Chromosome N3 Haplogroup. During the 16th and 17th centuries, the Asia-America-Europe trade may have brought the N3 Y chromosome to the Azores and the people of the Azores island of Terceira have a large amount of HLA genes of Mongoloid origin. The region of China-Mongolia is the origin of the N3 Haplogroup while Iberians lack it while only northern Europeans and Asians have it. Black slave men brought the E3a Y Chromosome to the Azores, since both Iberia and the rest of Europe lack the specific Azorean E3a lineage with the sY8a mutation.

While mainland Europeans lack it, Azoreans and Asians share the subtype B*2707 and Europeans ranked farther and Asians rank nearer genetically to Azoreans, or were related in the same measure as Europeans were to Azoreans. Azoreans have a large amount of A2-B50-DR7-DQ2, A29-B21-DR7-DQ2, A24-B44-DR6-DQ1 HLA haplotypes of Oriental Mongoloid origin. Presence of Mongoloids on the islands an unknown point in history was suggested.

A multi generational inherited Y chromosomes of Asian or sub-Saharan origins may be held by European looking people as it does not show physical looks, but the origin of the patrilineage.

== Demographic characteristics ==
According to surveys undertaken by Chinese associations, Chinese residents of Portugal have a very young average age, with 29.6% younger than 30, and 38.5% between 31 and 40 years old. Over three-quarters live in Lisbon, Porto, or Faro.

=== Migration waves and communities ===
Despite early arrivals of Chinese slaves, servants and traders to Portugal since the latter half of the 16th century, a visible Chinese community did not begin to form until after World War II. Before the war, Macanese people of mixed Chinese and Portuguese descent and ethnic Chinese with ties to the colonial Macau government were the primary Chinese immigrants to the country.

Since Chinese migration to Portugal greatly increased since the 1950s, the community's population has been categorized based on migration waves and purpose. The most established Chinese community in Portugal consists of those originally from the colony of Macau and their descendants. They are the most assimilated group of Chinese migrants and are dispersed throughout the country. Macau Chinese arrived in Portugal primarily as professional workers and students or due to family and career ties with the country. A smaller wave also arrived shortly before the Portuguese Handover of Macau to China in 1999.

The second group of migrants is composed of ethnic Chinese from other former Portuguese colonies, especially Mozambique, who arrived as those colonies sought independence during the early 1970s. The political instability and decline of economic activity in Portugal's African colonies created favorable conditions to immigrate to the metropole rather than remaining as a segregated group within a new government. Members of this migrant wave were able to integrate well into Portuguese society due to high levels of fluency in the Portuguese language and familiarity with Portuguese society.

Ethnic Chinese immigrants to Portugal continued to chiefly originate from Macau and Mozambique until the 1980s, when the number of students and economic migrants from mainland China began to rise. The vast majority of the new immigrants originated from the province of Zhejiang and consisted of entrepreneurs and laborers (chiefly unskilled) who found work under them. Groups of more skilled laborers and students later arrived along with family members brought over by earlier arrivals. Illegal immigration has been reported among this group of migrants, including those who remain in Portugal even after having residency permits denied.

Due to the different natures of Chinese immigration to Portugal, the community is not strongly unified on its ethnic lines but rather through migrant history. Ethnic Chinese originating from Macau and Mozambique have successfully integrated into Portuguese society, while at the same time have established Chinese community organizations for cultural purposes that serve both groups. Meanwhile, recent arrivals from China continue to seek out informal social networks usually headed by earlier migrants. The lack of Portuguese fluency and reluctance for inter-ethnic communication are major attributes for this dependency. Also, contact between recent and established immigrants is hindered through varieties of Chinese spoken, as the latter use Cantonese rather than Mandarin. Nevertheless, there has been some recent intergroup contact through professional services offered by the established Chinese community.

== Employment ==
82.6% of the Chinese workforce in Portugal are employees. However, the number of entrepreneurs has shown an upward trend, nearly doubling from 9.4% in 1990 to 17.4% in 2000. Four-fifths of the self-employed are drawn from the population of recent migrants from Zhejiang; rates of entrepreneurship in the other groups are much lower. Chinese migrants from Mozambique and the other ex-Portuguese colonies, due to their fluency in Portuguese and familiarity with local business practices, are able to enter the mainstream economy and find professional employment, especially as bank employees, engineers, and doctors.

Most Chinese-owned firms are small family enterprises, in the services, retail, and import-export sectors. Their suppliers are Chinese-owned firms in other parts of Europe; Portuguese firms are among their clients but rarely among their suppliers. There is a tendency for Chinese business owners to seek out areas with few other Chinese, to avoid competition and find new markets.

== Neighbourhoods ==
In Lisbon from Martim Moniz Station on Rua da Palma, and in the 21st century in the outskirts of Vila do Conde Chinese have settled in Portugal.

== See also ==
- Portuguese Macau
- China–Portugal relations
- Portugal-Taiwan relations
- Chinese diaspora in France
- Chinese people in Spain
- Macau people
- Macanese people
- Macau
- Immigration to Portugal
