= Fangshan =

Fangshan may refer to the following locations:

- Fangshan District (房山区), Beijing
- Fangshan County (方山县), Lüliang, Shanxi
- Fangshan, Pingtung (枋山鄉), township in Pingtung County, Taiwan

Towns

- Fangshan, Jiangsu (房山镇), subdivision of Donghai County, Jiangsu
- Fangshan, Liaoning (芳山镇), subdivision of Heishan County, Liaoning
- Fangshan, Shandong

Written as "方山镇"

- Fangshan, Henan, subdivision of Yuzhou, Henan
- Fangshan, Sichuan, subdivision of Jiangyang District, Luzhou, Sichuan
