= Hernando de los Ríos Coronel =

Spanish cartographer

Hernando de los Ríos Coronel (1559–1621?) was a mathematician, cosmographer, cartographer, navigator, naval pilot, administrator, soldier, priest, and advocate (procurator general) at the Spanish court of the inhabitants of the Philippines from 1606 to 1610 and again from 1618 until his death.

Having attained the rank of military captain, he accompanied governor Luis Pérez Dasmariñas on his expedition to Luzon and Cambodia and spent time in China in 1597. There he prepared the first map of Luzon, Taiwan (also known as Formosa or Isla Hermosa) and certain areas of the Chinese coast.

== As navigator ==
De los Ríos Coronel combined his expertise as navigator with those of an experimenter which was a common practice at the time. He had received renewed impulse with the founding of the Spanish Royal Academy of Sciences in Madrid. His scientific developments aimed to update instruments and tables for navigation based on astronomical observation, combined with an attempt to determine the geographical longitude at sea.

Two examples where he combined his expertise as a navigator with those of an experimenter, are of the development of a process of enabling the extraction of sweetwater from seawater while at sea, for which he requested a license and testing a new type of sea compass invented by Fonseca.

Also, as a navigator de los Ríos advocated reform of the inequality in treatment of the Asian crewmembers of the transpacific voyages that he sailed on. He recommended providing them with adequate food, clothing and protection against the elements. The harsh working conditions of Asian mariners, coupled with the long and perilous journey, made many of them decide to stay on in the Americas, thus forming part of a wider migration of Asians to the Americas and New Spain.

Some of de los Rios Coronel's first hand accounts saw Asians, particularly Filipinos treated "like dogs", they had no proper clothing for the cold weather and some froze to death, mentioning "each new dawn comes there are three or four dead men".

== Collaboration with Dasmariñas during Cambodian-Spanish War ==
Hernando de los Ríos Coronel and Luis Pérez Dasmariñas collaborated during the Cambodian–Spanish War of 1593 to 1597. Their collaboration was part of the broader Spanish expansion in Asia, and it involved strategic and military considerations in the context of the Spanish presence in the region of which Dasmariñas was a great enthusiast. The ill-fated expedition of Don Luis Pérez Dasmariñas to Cambodia took place in 1598, which coincided with Don Juan Zamudio's expedition.

Initially, Dasmariñas set sail from Manila with two ships and a force of 200 men in response to a purported request from Prauncar, the King of Cambodia, seeking Spanish reinforcements and missionaries. However, a storm scattered Dasmariñas' fleet, and his ship went aground off the coast of Guangdong (Canton) near Macao. After encountering hostility from the local authorities, Dasmariñas decided to move what was left of his expeditionary force to the port of Pinhal where Don Juan Zamudio had recently established himself. Afterwards, Don Luis decided to send a mission to Canton to request help.

Upon learning that Captain Hernando de los Rios and another companion had gone to Canton for the same purpose, two Portuguese from Macao were promptly sent by their captain, Don Pablo de Portugal to oppose them upon entry into China. They accused the Spaniards of being thieves, corsairs, and people of ill repute, just as they had done previously to Juan Zamudio, who was then in his ship at the Port of Pinhal, as mentioned earlier.

According to De Morga Captain Hernando de los Rios seemed to have performed the role of both emissary and leader. He writes that during the crisis:

Captain Hernando de los Rios and his companion encountered, in Canton, Alferez Domingo de Artacho and other companions from the ship of Don Juan. Upon learning about the misfortune of Don Luis's armada and its proximity to being lost, they united and defended themselves against the accusations and claims of the Portuguese. Eventually, as most of the issues related to Don Juan had been resolved, the Viceroy and Mandarins learned that all were from Manila. They became aware of who Don Luis Dasmariñas was and that he was leading his fleet to Cambodia. They received him with the same willingness as they did for Don Juan de Zamudio.

Given the circumstances, they provided him with a safe passage into the Port of Pinhal, where both groups met with mixed feelings - sorrow for the loss of Don Luis Dasmariñas and joy at finding Don Juan de Zamudio with his people. Don Juan's group supplied them with some necessary items. With their assistance, Don Luis promptly purchased a strong, medium-sized junk in which he embarked with some of his people, artillery, and remaining supplies. They enjoyed the same comforts that the Spaniards from Don Juan de Zamudio's ship had in that port, intending to stay there until ships were sent from Manila, and whatever else was needed, to continue their journey to Cambodia. Don Luis never showed signs of being discouraged or disheartened throughout this period.

By the end of 1598, Dasmariñas' plans to continue to Cambodia were thwarted by Captain Paulo de Portugal, who opposed the Spanish. Juan Zamudio returned to the Philippines, requesting help for the Cambodia expedition, but Governor Francisco Tello, lacking resources, ordered Dasmariñas to return to Manila.

== As cosmographer and mapmaker ==
Originally, cosmography had the meaning of protoscience of mapping the general features of the cosmos, heaven and Earth, thus a cosmographer combined map making (i.e. cartographer) with scientific experiments aimed to update instruments and tables for a wide range of applications. In de los Rios Coronel's case this had mainly to do with navigation based on astronomical observation and mathematics, specifically with the Philippines and Taiwan.

=== Reasons for making the map of Taiwan ===
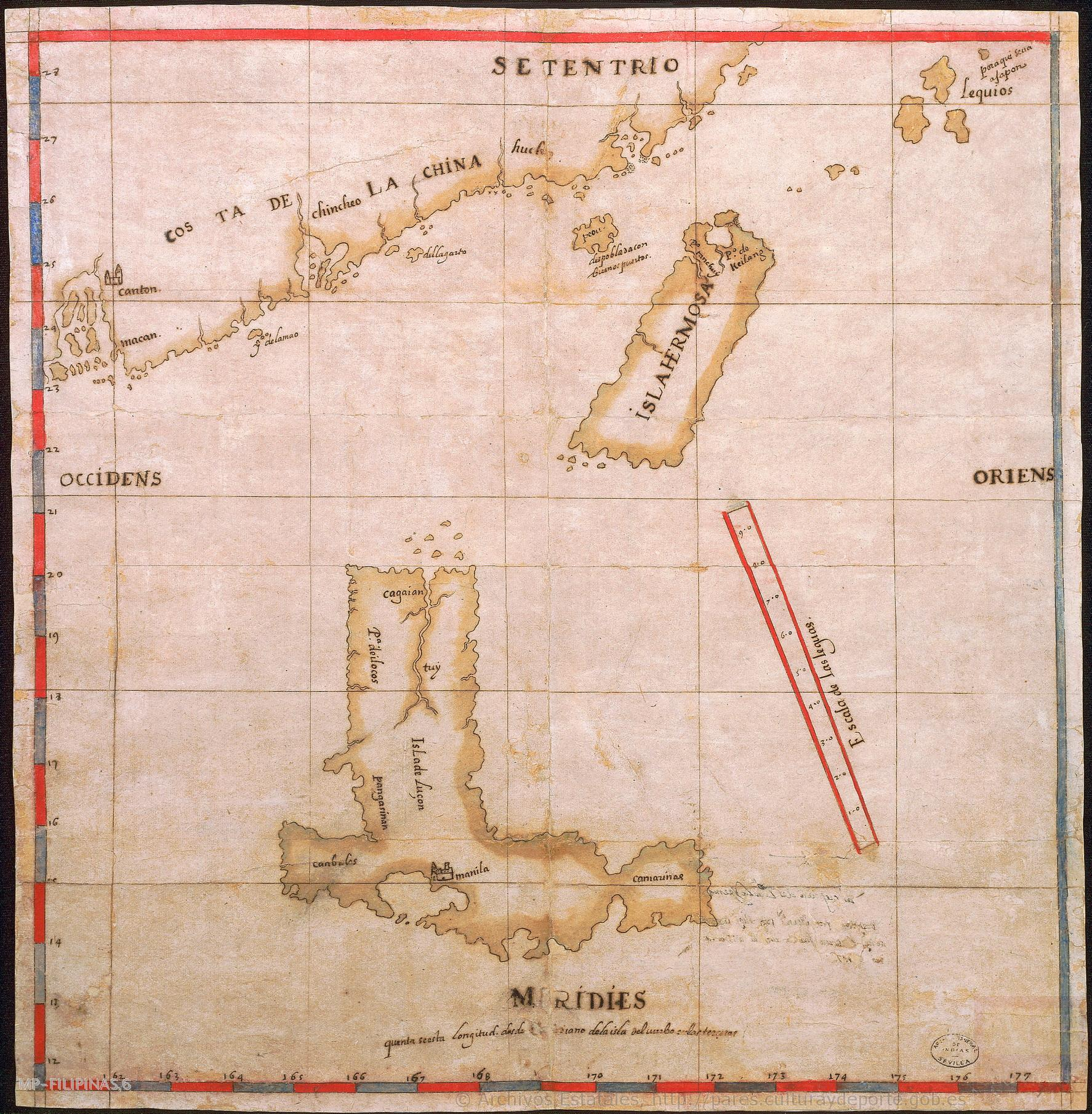
Map of the islands of Taiwan, Luzón and the Chinese coast

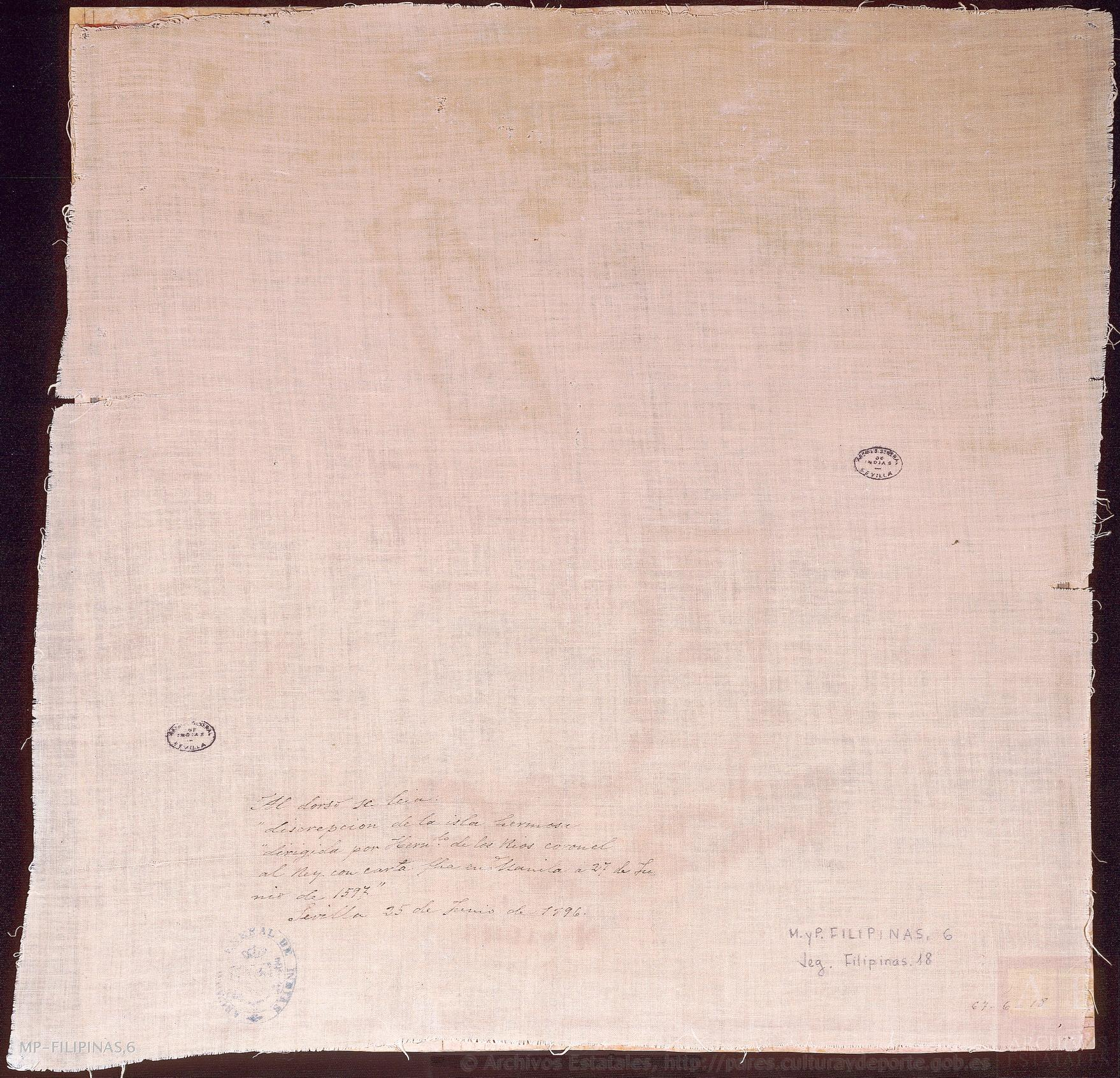
Back side, including watermark and reference to de los Ríos Coronel as author

Andrade argues that de los Ríos Coronel viewed Taiwan as being part of the Philippine archipelago and a possession of the Crown of Castile.

With a distance of only 700 kilometers north of the island of Luzon, which formed the heart of the Spanish colony of the Philippines, Spanish officials argued for the defense of Taiwan against the Dutch (which had established a colony in the south of Taiwan). Together with these officials, de los Ríos Coronel feared Taiwan might soon be lost and the Philippines being threatened next.

Furthermore, he pointed out that Taiwan possessed a good harbor at Jilong, modern-day Port of Keelung which could be easily defended; "With three-hundred men and a fortress placed there, all the powers of these parts would not be enough to dislodge them, for the entrance is narrow and easy to defend with artillery. The port is large, deep, and safe from winds."

=== Map of Taiwan (Isla Hermosa) ===
According to Lamb, in 1597 de los Ríos Coronel drew the first map of the islands of Taiwan (Hermosa o Formosa), Luzón and the Chinese coast. The map is oriented north to south and west to east. It depicts the main island of Luzon (currently part of Philippines) on the bottom of the map, including Manila and Manila Bay; Cagayan is spelt as cagaian on the map.

Taiwan is depicted at the top of the map as 'Isla Hermosa' (lit. beautiful island in Spanish). While on the top right corner of the island is the Port of Keelung (Puerto de Keilang). Also in the top right corner, the Ryukyu Islands are depicted, which are named Lequios and writing por aqui sera a Japon.

On the top left corner of the map he depicts the locations of Canton (modern Guangzhou and Macau).
