= Chinese Brazilians =

Brazilians of Chinese birth or descent

Sino-brasileiros (Portuguese) 巴西華人 / 巴西华人 (Chinese)
- A group photo of Chinese migrants from Qingtian, Zhejiang in Brazil, ca. 1960s

Total population
- c. 350,000

Regions with significant populations
- São Paulo City, Belo Horizonte, Curitiba and Rio de Janeiro

Languages
- Portuguese: Cantonese • Mandarin • Other languages of China

Religion
- Predominantly: Christianity (mainly Roman Catholicism); Others: Unaffiliated • Buddhism • Taoism

Related ethnic groups
- Other Asian Brazilians, Macanese people, Overseas Chinese

Chinese Brazilians (Portuguese: Sino-brasileiro or Chinês-brasileiro; Chinese: 巴西華人 / 巴西华人) are Brazilians of Chinese ancestry or birth. The ethnic Chinese population in Brazil was estimated to be approximately 250,000 in 2007.

The first Chinese people came to Brazil in 1814, when Chinese tea planters were sent from Portugal to the Royal Botanical Garden in Rio de Janeiro. Following the end of the transatlantic slave trade in 1850, there was a growing labor shortage in the booming coffee plantations of southwestern Brazil during the second half of the 19th century, which led the Brazilian government to look for alternative sources of labor elsewhere. The main sources of replacement labor were Europe and, later on, Japan, but small numbers of Chinese immigrants are said to have reached Brazil during the 19th century (less than 3 thousand total). There are reports of Chinese laborers arriving in Brazil as early as the 1870s, but those early flows were limited due to restrictions imposed by the Chinese government; therefore, the vast majority of the contemporary population of Chinese ancestry in Brazil is descended from much later flows of immigrants into the country, starting in the 1900s.

São Paulo now has the largest Chinese Brazilian population, in particular in the district of Liberdade. The majority of the Chinese immigrants settled in São Paulo. Some Chinese immigrants work as merchants in international trade, lawyers, members of the parliament and the house of representatives and doctors. Chinese immigrants have integrated into Brazilian society by building intercultural exchange in the communities. Besides being an area famous for its strong Japanese presence, a significant number of Taiwanese immigrants out of 70,000 in total, have settled in Liberdade, and many Chinese immigrants have come to Liberdade following the Communist revolution in 1949. These Macau immigrants can usually speak and understand Portuguese (its Creole, Macanese or Patuá, is also spoken), allowing them to adjust more easily to life in Brazil. In the 1950s, there was also a wave of Chinese immigrants belonging to the country's ethnic Russian community.

Today, the majority of Chinese Brazilians only speak Portuguese, although some may be bilingual, speaking Portuguese and Chinese.

== History ==
=== Early era ===
It is known that there were Chinese in Brazil as far back as the early 19th century; Rugendas painted a depiction of Chinese Tea planters in Rio de Janeiro during the period of the Portuguese Royal family in Brazil. In 1814 John VI of Portugal brought 300 Chinese from Macau to work in the Botanical Garden of Rio de Janeiro.

Chinese people started moving to Brazil in the late 19th century when Brazil abolished the slave trade, which had as a necessary consequence the eventual doom of slavery. As a result, the number of Afro-Brazilians slaves decreased gradually, which created labor shortages. To solve the problem, the Brazilians came up with a plan of having immigrants to the country to replace the slaves. The Brazilian government and plantation owners started looking to different areas of the world to try to find suitable groups to import into the country, Europe ended up being the most relevant, and, later on, Japan and the Ottoman Empire were also major sources of immigration to Brazil, but India and China were also considered.

In this context, the Brazilian government also considered importing Chinese laborers, just like other tropical nations which had done the same since the 1840s. However, as China had known that the Chinese laborers had received harsh labor treatments in countries like Cuba and Peru, China had prohibited all other forms of immigration but the voluntary ones, and allowed importation of laborers only to countries with commercial treaties. Despite the barriers set by the Chinese government, Brazilian companies still managed to have 1,000 Chinese to work as tea planters in 1874. In 1875, the Brazilian companies tried to bring in more Chinese workers to Brazil by recruiting those in the province of Guangdong (Canton) and California. To legally import more Chinese laborers, the Brazilian government negotiated a commercial treaty with China, but China signed the commercial treaty with reluctance in Tianjin, China on September 5, 1880 with a revised contract on October 3, 1881. With the low cost of transportation that is 35 mil-réis per passenger, which was less than 20 U.S dollars, the new Brazilian companies tried to seek more laborers from China by connecting with the director of the China Merchants Steam Navigation Company called Tong King Sing. Despite the plans to transport more Chinese laborers to Brazil, the Chinese government continued displaying hesitant attitude in the 1890s. Therefore, China was not a viable alternative for Brazil in its search for new sources of labor in the second half of the 19th century and early 20th century.

=== Racial tension ===
The issue of how to replace slave labor raised huge controversies in Brazil, and there were both sides that defended and criticized the alternative of inviting in Chinese immigrants to work in the coffee plantations. One such argument that was a cause of much controversy was the idea of racial "whitening", which is a concept inspired in the ideas of Social Darwinism and eugenics that defended the need to import more European immigrants into Brazil in order to "whiten" its population. In this context, the idea of inviting Asian workers, including those of Japanese and Chinese origin, was seen by some as a possible set back that could harm the process of "europeanizing" Brazil, due to perceived cultural and racial inferiority to the Europeans, and feared the consequences of introducing "alien populations" that did not match the traditional composition of the Brazilian population at the time (mostly of European and African ancestry). On the other hand, some, such as the Republican leader Quintino Bocayuva, defended the notion that having Chinese laborers would benefit Brazil.

=== Modern migration ===
Chinese immigration to Brazil expanded signficantly during the 20th century through successive waves originating from different regions. Migrants from Qingtian in Zhejiang and Guangdong settled in Rio de Janeiro, initially working as itinerant traders before establishing businesses. During the 1950s to 1970s., immigration increased through arrivals from Taiwan and other overseas Chinese communities, particularly Hong Kong and Macau, with São Paulo becoming an important centre. These new immigrants came to comprise the vast majority of the population of Chinese ancestry in Brazil, and brought visible changes to the landscape of the population of Asian ancestry in the country.

== 20th and 21st Century Immigration ==
The vast majority of Chinese immigration to Brazil took place in the 20th and 21st centuries, especially after the World War II. Officially, the first ship bringing Chinese immigrants arrived in the country in 1900, and the number of immigrants started to increase particularly after the end of the Chinese Civil War. There was a second wave of immigration in the 1970s and 1980s, when China opened its economy, and a third wave more recently in the 2000s due to the increasing presence of Chinese companies and investments in Latin America. Nowadays, about 40 thousand Chinese citizens and a total of around 200 thousand people of Chinese ancestry live in Brazil.

=== Life in São Paulo ===
There are currently a total of around 350,000 Chinese immigrants and descendants in Brazil. About 200,000 of them reside in São Paulo, São Paulo.

Chinese merchants started to expand their business after immigration, but some negative influences hindered the growth. For instance, in 2007, the Brazilian judicial system had settled down the largest shopping center and 50 stores in São Paulo, and arrested six merchants. Even though there were illegal operations and smuggling among the Chinese immigrants, it was not the majority.

=== The Brazilian Dream ===
25 de Março street in São Paulo is a place with 2.5 km in length (approximately 1.55 miles) where some Chinese Brazilians mainly sell their merchandise to make a living. There are more than 3,000 Chinese Brazilian-run stores out of 4,000 shops in total, and the expansion took place in less than 30 years, replacing a previous generation of mostly Arab shop-owners. A similar phenomenon exists in the SAARA commercial district of Rio de Janeiro, where around 20% of the shops are owned by Chinese immigrants and their descendants when traditionally that area was dominated by Syrian and Lebanese businesses.

=== Recognition and legacy ===
The Brazilian House of Representatives and the city of São Paulo Parliament passed the proposal of setting August 15 as "Chinese Immigrants Day."

== Notable people ==
- Walter Afanasieff, Brazilian-born songwriter and record producer; his maternal family were Russian-Chinese.
- Alan, Brazilian footballer and naturalized Chinese citizen
- Ken Chang, a Brazilian actor of Chinese descent, popular TV series star in Taiwan and Mainland China (born in Taiwan)
- Leung Ka Hai, Brazilian footballer of Chinese descent.
- Shaoyu Li (李少玉), as a Brazilian of Cantonese descent, was elected as a member of parliament for São Paulo in 2010, making her the first Chinese Brazilian woman in politics. With the mission of promoting Chinese culture and serving Chinese overseas, Li has been assisting youth Chinese Brazilians finding their cultural heritage and having other political members and Chinese overseas to participate in cultural events. With her involvement in Chinese culture promotion, acupuncture is now popular among Brazilians for chronic arthritis, martial arts has been a popular self-defense with large number of schools, and Peking Opera has widely used in performances which was performed by Brazilians.
- Gui Lin, an Olympic athlete in table tennis (born in Nanning, Guangxi, China)
- William Woo (威廉巫): a second generation Chinese Brazilian. In 2000, he was elected as a member of parliament for the city of São Paulo and continued through re-election in 2004. Wu was elected as a federal house of representative, which he was the first Chinese Brazilian in political position.
- Felipe Almeida Wu, 2016 Olympic silver medalist in shooting – 10 m air pistol (born in São Paulo, Brazil)
- Lucia Wu (吳映香), a Brazilian singer of Chinese descent, born and raised in São Paulo. Relocating to Beijing at 8 years-old, she was one of the participants in Produce 101 and concluded with No.22.
- Christine Yufon, a Chinese-born Brazilian model, businesswoman, and sculptor

== See also ==
- Brazil–China relations
- Brazil–Taiwan relations

== Sources ==
- Teixeira Leite, José Roberto (1999). A China no Brasil: influências, marcas, ecos e sobrevivências chinesas na sociedade e na arte brasileiras [China in Brazil: Chinese influences, marks, echoes and survivals in Brazilian society and art] (in Portuguese). UNICAMP. Universidade Estadual de Campinas. ISBN 978-85-268-0436-4.
