= Chinese diaspora in Greece =

希腊华人
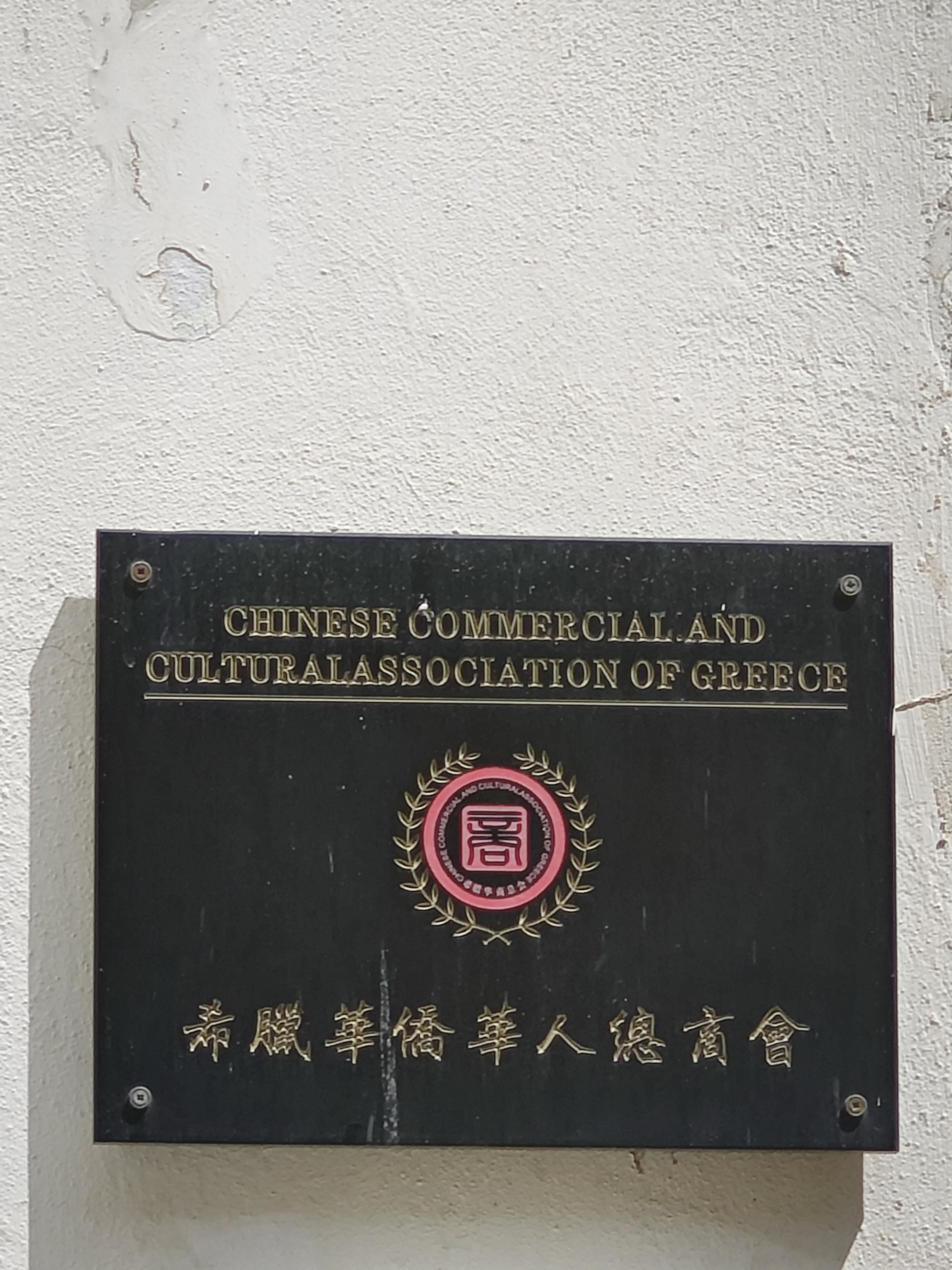
- Plaque of the Chinese Commercial and Cultural Association of Greece

Total population
- ~25,000

Regions with significant populations
- Athens, Thessaloniki, Patras, Herakleion, Chania, Volos

Languages
- Mandarin, Qingtian dialect, Wenzhounese, Fuzhou dialect, Greek

Religion
- Predominantly Chinese Buddhism, Chinese folk religion, Confucianism Some Roman Catholicism, Protestantism

Related ethnic groups
- Overseas Chinese

The Chinese diaspora in Greece (Chinese: 希腊华人, Pinyin: Xīlà huárén, Greek: Κινέζοι στην Ελλάδα) are the overseas Chinese communities of various descents that reside in Greece. Mainly concentrated in major cities like Athens, Thessaloniki, and Patras, they are also scattered in small and medium-sized towns and islands throughout the country. The community's size is approximately 25,000 people, and is mostly engaged in industries such as wholesale and retail business, catering, tourism, wine, and olive oil trade.

== History ==
=== Early period ===
Despite the long history of cultural exchange between China and Greece, direct population movement and exchanges between the two countries were relatively scarce, mainly involving a small number of government officials, diplomats, and scholars until the mid-to-late Qing period and after the Greek War of Independence.

In 1908, Kang Youwei (康有为), the leading reformist figure who was in exile after the failure of the Hundred Days' Reform (戊戌变法), traveled to Greece and wrote "A Travelogue of Greece" (希腊游记). In it, he not only described in detail famous historical sites such as the Acropolis of Athens, the Temple of Aphrodite on the Corinthian Acropolis, and the Palace of Achilles on Corfu, but also repeatedly compared the differences between the political developments of ancient Greece and ancient China. He argued that the centralization of China and democracy in Greece were due to geographical and natural circumstances to which each civilization is situated:

"Democracy and republicanism can be implemented only in nations that are small... and that is the reason why Greece was able to create a political system based on civil rights. Given the size of China, even if there are benevolent rulers and good governance, it will not be able to accomplish this ideal."

At the same time, he believed that due to the ongoing trend of modernization:

"The material innovations in railways and telegraphs have managed to reduce the size of this world... civil rights and parliaments are principles, the ultimate justice, and an inevitable trend. Greek law and politics thus became the law of the world."

During the Republic of China period, Chinese intellectuals developed a stronger interest in Greek culture, especially ancient Greek mythology and philosophy. In 1933, Luo Niansheng (罗念生) arrived in Greece and studied at the American School of Classical Studies at Athens, becoming the first Chinese student to study classical culture in Greece. Subsequently, he translated a large number of ancient Greek literary works and since 1952 conducted research at Peking University and the Chinese Academy of Social Sciences. His late-life work, "On Ancient Greek Drama" (论古希腊戏剧), systematically outlined the characteristics and development of ancient Greek tragedy and comedy for Chinese readers. As a result, the Academy of Athens awarded him the highest prize in "Literature and Art" in December 1987 in recognition of his contributions.

=== Recent immigration ===
According to the Overseas Chinese Economic Yearbook (华侨经济年鉴), due to the difficulty in the learning of Greek language, and strict restrictions on foreign immigration and settlement by the Greek government, there was only one Chinese surnamed Wong in Athens in 1951. In the following two or three decades, most of the Chinese residing in Greece were women of Taiwanese descent married to Greek sailors and ship engineers.

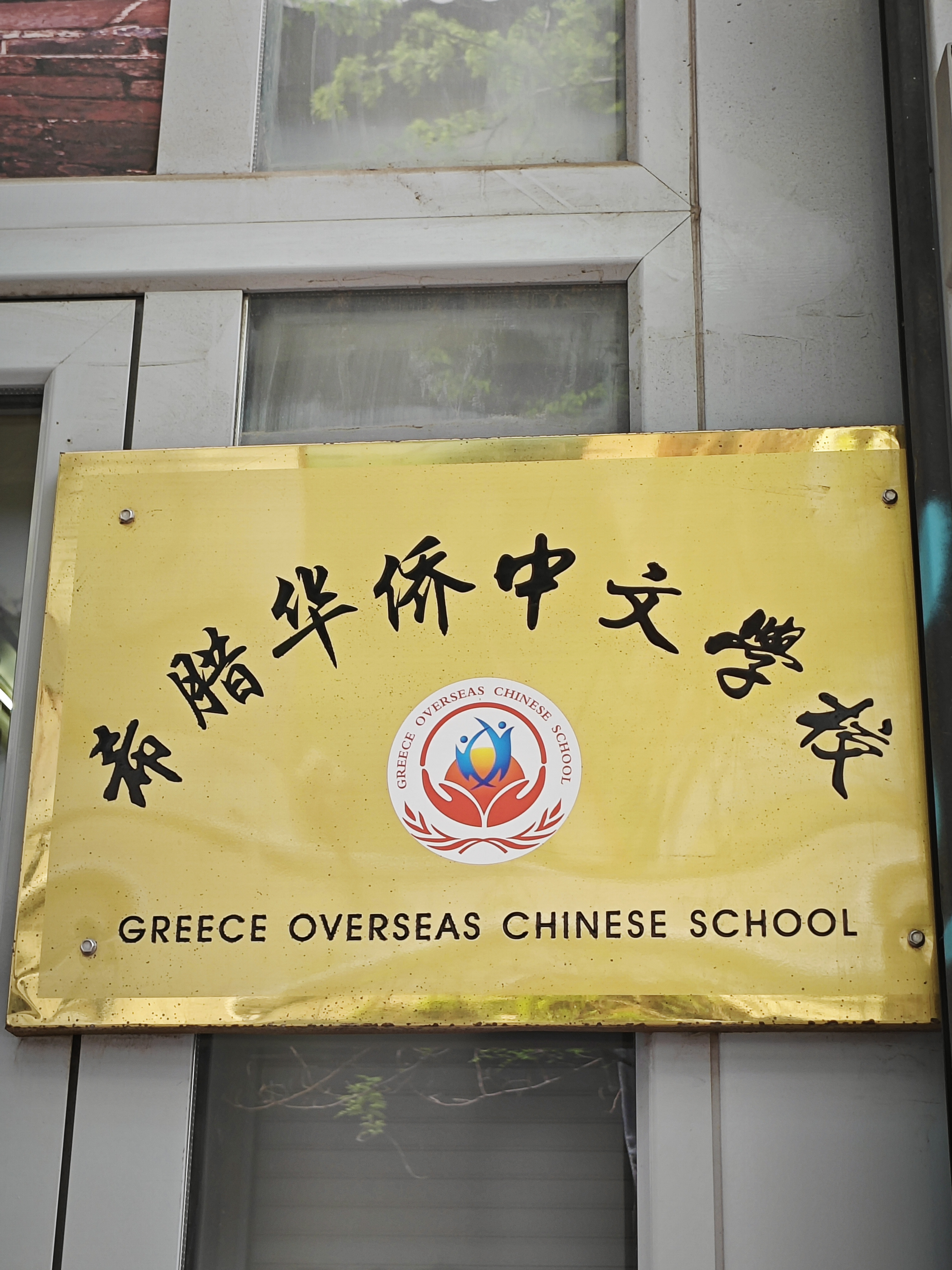
Plaque of Overseas Chinese School that offers Chinese language and culture courses in Athens, Greece

In 1985, Greece accepted 59 Chinese refugees from Indochina, significantly increased the number of Chinese residents in Greece. They mostly worked as factory workers cooks, hotel staff, or providing service to the hospitals run by the American troops in Greece.

Beginning in the 1990s, Chinese migrants from counties such as Qingtian, Rui'an, and Wencheng in southern Zhejiang and Fuqing in eastern Fujian began opening grocery stores and restaurants in the Omonoia Square area of downtown Athens. This area has now become known as Chinatown. An increasing number of Chinese-owned businesses have also shifted their focus to exporting Greek wines, olive oil, and other goods to China.

Since 2010, Greece has offered the "Golden Visa" investment immigration program, attracting wealthy immigrants from middle-class and above backgrounds across China. As of 2022, approximately 22,000 Chinese applicants had obtained Greek long-term residency through this pathway.

== Organizations ==
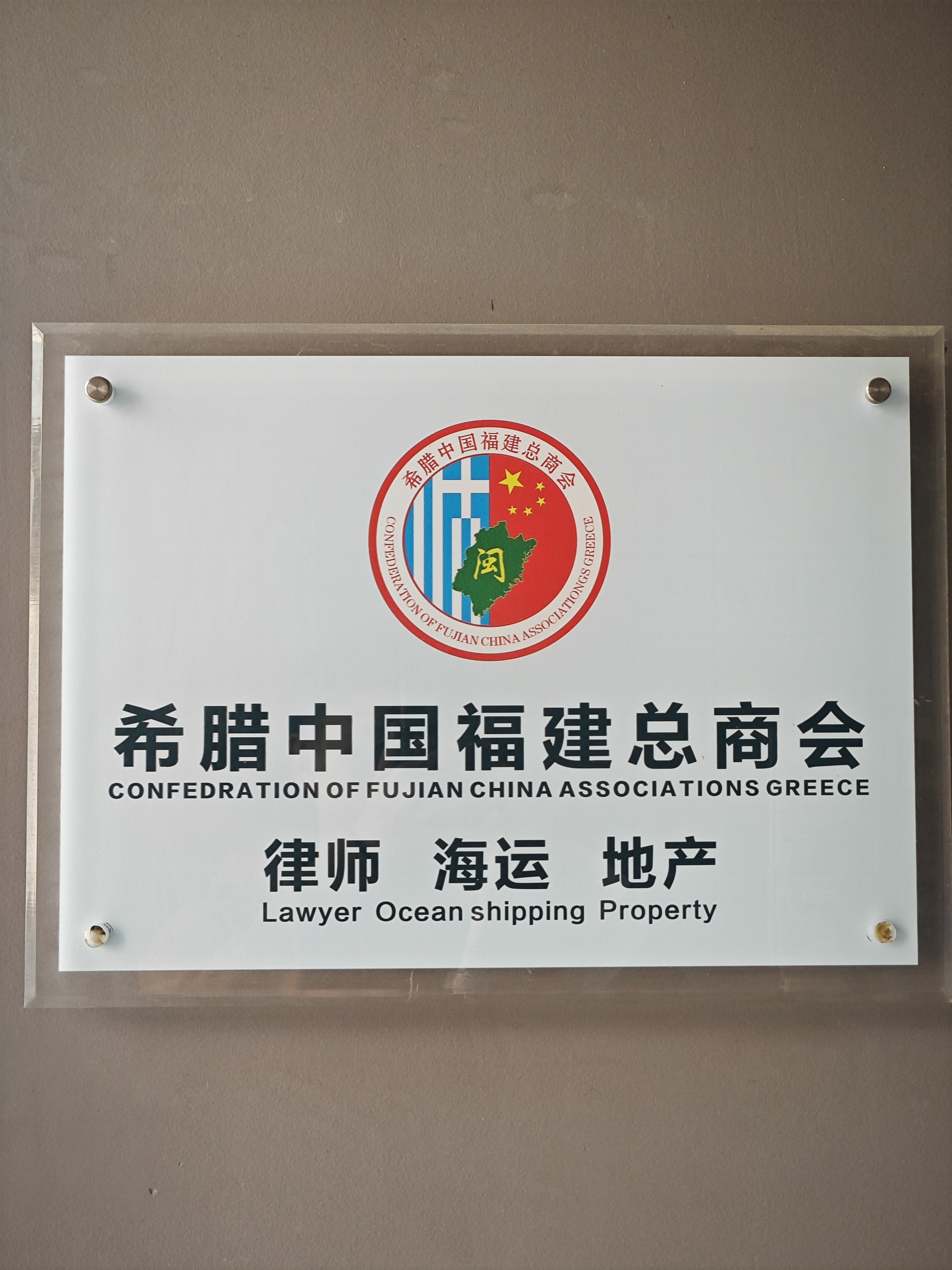
Plaque of Confederation of Fujian China Associations, Greece

The main overseas Chinese associations in Greece currently include:

- The Federation of Fujian Overseas Chinese Associations in Greece (希腊华侨华人福建联合总会)
- The Greek Overseas Chinese Women's Association (希腊华侨华人妇女会)
- The Federation of Overseas Chinese Associations in Greece (希腊华侨华人联合总会)
- The Federation of Overseas Chinese Associations in Greece (希腊华侨华人总会)
- The General Chamber of Commerce of Overseas Chinese in Greece (希腊华侨华人总商会)
- The Greek Chinese Tourism Association (希腊华人旅游业联合会)
- The General Chamber of Commerce of Fujian Merchants in Greece (希腊闽商总商会)
- The Qingtian Association of Greece (希腊青田同乡会)
- The General Chamber of Commerce of Fujian in Greece (希腊中国福建总商会)
- The Association for the Promotion of Peaceful Reunification of China in Greece (希腊中国和平统一促进会)
- The China-Greece Investors Association (中国希腊投资者联谊会)
- The China-Greece Chamber of Industry and Commerce (中希工商总会)
- The China-Greece Cultural Exchange Association (中希文化交流协会)
- The China-Greece Friendship Association of Overseas Chinese in Greece (中希友好华侨华人协会)
- The China-Greece Cultural Association (希中文化协会)
- The China-Greece Cultural and Artistic Exchange Association (中希文化艺术交流协会)

== See also ==
- Chinese people in Italy
- Chinese people in Spain
- Immigration to Greece
- China-Greece relations
