= China–Ethiopia relations =

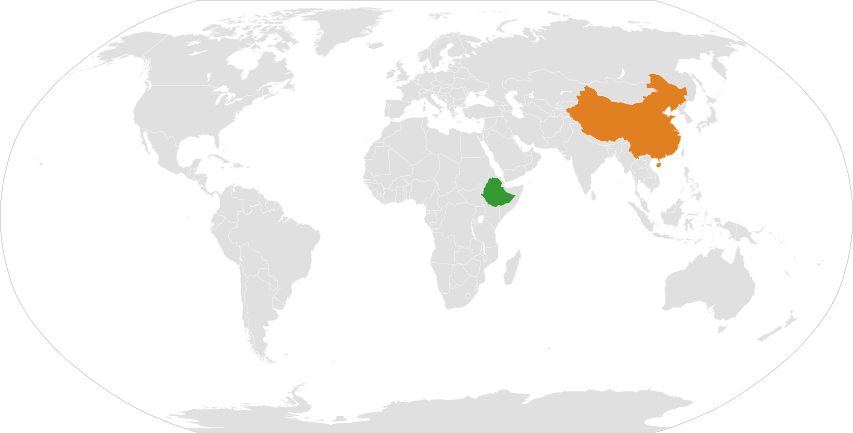

- Ethiopia: China

People's Republic of China–Ethiopia relations were established in 1970. Ethiopia has an embassy in Beijing and the People's Republic of China (PRC) has an embassy in Addis Ababa.

China's bilateral relationship with Ethiopia is one of its most prioritized in Africa and China believes Ethiopia is particularly significant in peace and security within east Africa. Relations are longstanding, with Chinese direct investment (FDI) in Ethiopia reaching US$4 billion and bilateral trade growing to $5.4 billion by 2016-2018.

== History ==
It is not precisely known when China and Ethiopia first made direct contact. The sinologist A. Hermann believed that a live rhinoceros that arrived at the court of the Chinese Emperor Ping from the country of the "Agazi" or "Agazin" between AD 1 and 6 came from the Horn of Africa. Later in AD 97, Chinese explorer Gan Ying travelled to 'Dou-le', which has been equated with the Axumite port city Adulis, he also returned accompanied by an official embassy from 'Dou-le'. Ethiopian expert Richard Pankhurst is certain that by the Tang dynasty (618–907) "the Chinese were certainly acquainted with the Horn of Africa." From that period onwards, China traded with not only Ethiopia and the Horn, but with the peoples of the Eastern African coast, obtaining elephants' tusks, rhinoceros horns, pearls, the musk of the civet cat, ambergris, and slaves. Starting in the Yuan dynasty the Chinese began to increasingly trade directly with Africans, which is attested not only in contemporary documents, but from archeological finds of Chinese coins and porcelain. Despite this early commercial contact, neither side showed much interest in diplomatic activity with one another until the twentieth century. The Republic of China was one of only five governments which refused to recognize Italy's conquest of Ethiopia.

=== Cold War ===
Relations between the PRC and the Ethiopian Empire were poor during the Haile Selassie era, when Ethiopia was allied with the Western Bloc in the Cold War. During the Korean War, Ethiopia's Kagnew Battalion under the United Nations Command fought the PRC's People's Volunteer Army at the Battle of Pork Chop Hill. PRC support with arms and military training for the Eritrean Liberation Front also contributed to tension between the two countries.

=== Establishment of diplomatic relations ===
The two countries established diplomatic relations on 24 November 1970 when the People's Republic of China under Chairman of the Chinese Communist Party Mao Zedong agreed to recognize Eritrea as Ethiopian, in exchange for Haile Selassie's recognition of Taiwan (controlled by the Republic of China) as Chinese, although Ethiopia was among the signatories of the Treaty of San Francisco in 1951. Some views of Ethiopian diplomatic history contend that Ethiopia's decision to initiate diplomatic ties with the PRC was part of a hedging strategy in relation to the United States.

In 1971, Ethiopia voted to admit representatives from the Beijing government and expel those representing the government in Taipei. Relations improved for a short period after the Ethiopian Revolution of 1974, but became strained as the Ethiopian military junta developed increasingly close ties with the Soviet Union. After the Ethiopian People's Revolutionary Democratic Front took power in 1991, relations have steadily improved, with increasing diplomatic contacts and growing trade and Chinese investment in the Ethiopian economy.

As a part of China's diplomacy, the Chinese Communist Party (CCP) conducted significant party-to-party relations with the Ethiopian People's Revolutionary Democratic Front (EPRDF). The EPRDF's disintegration in 2019 disrupted China's knowledge and understanding of the domestic situation in Ethiopia. The CCP regularly conducts bilateral visits and briefing with the Prosperity Party, which arose following the disintegration of EPRDF. As of 2023, the CCP's party-to-party relations with the Prosperity Party had not reached the same level of relations it had with the EPRDF and the Tigray People's Liberation Front.

== Official contacts, agreements, and treaties ==
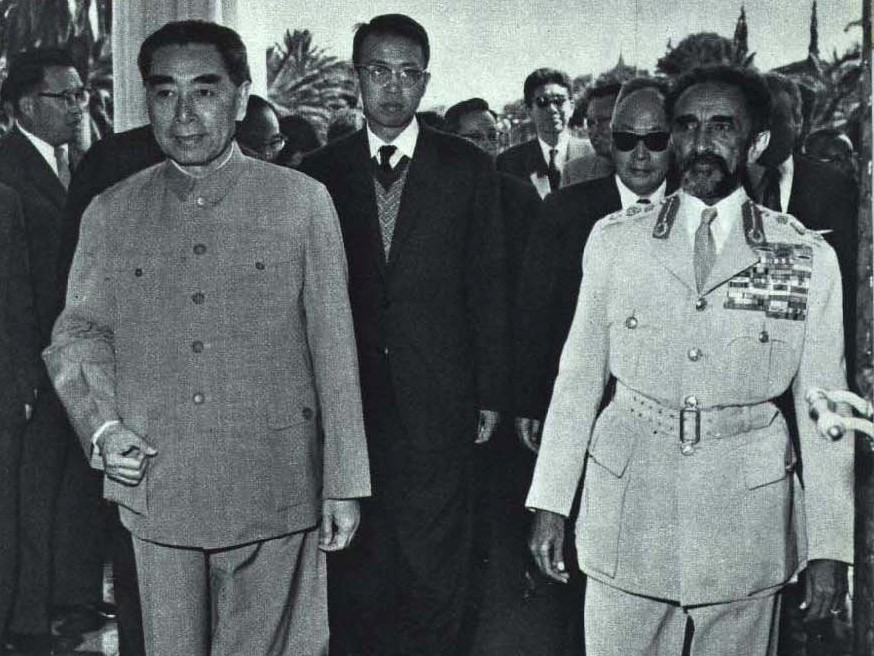
Zhou Enlai and Haile Selassie in 1964

Chinese premier Zhou Enlai visited Ethiopia in January 1964. The Ethiopian emperor Haile Selassie visited Beijing in October 1971, where he was received by CCP Chairman Mao Zedong. Qian Qichen, China's vice-premier and minister of foreign affairs, visited Ethiopia in July 1989, January 1991 and January 1994. CCP General Secretary Jiang Zemin visited in May 1996.

In June 2001, the Ethiopian deputy foreign minister visited Beijing, where he expressed support for the "One China" policy in the dispute with Taiwan. In December 2003, Chinese premier Wen Jiabao visited Ethiopia to attend the opening of the Forum on China–Africa Cooperation. In December 2004, the heads of the Ethiopian and Chinese legislatures met in Beijing and in a joint statement said that the two counties wish to expand all aspects of cooperation. In May 2007, China's Assistant Minister of Commerce Wang Chao visited Addis Ababa and signed a debt relief agreement worth US$18.5 million. In February 2008, the Chinese minister of construction met his counterpart in Addis Ababa, and reemphasized the commitment of the two governments to cooperation. The Ethiopian minister welcomed the involvement of Chinese construction companies in improving Ethiopian infrastructure. In November 2008, Wu Bangguo, the chairman of the Standing Committee of the National People's Congress visited Ethiopia where he met senior Ethiopian officials and political leaders including President Girma Wolde-Giorgis and discussed ways to strengthen economic cooperation.

Agreements between the two countries include Agreement for Economic and Technological Cooperation (1971, 1988 and 2002); Trade Agreement (1971, 1976); Trade Protocol (1984,1986,1988); Agreement for Trade, Economic and Technological Cooperation (1996) and Agreement for Mutual Promotion and Protection of Investment (1988). In May 2009 the two countries signed an agreement to eliminate double taxation, expected to boost trade and investment.

Ethiopia and China signed a military cooperation agreement in 2005 which covers military training, technology exchange, and joint peacekeeping missions. As part this military cooperation agreement, Ethiopian field-grade officers routinely receive training in China.

In 2014, China and Ethiopia signed a strategic partnership agreement.

China has an extradition treaty with Ethiopia.

=== Education ===
China provides support for Confucius Institutes and Confucius Classrooms in Ethiopia. In an analysis of China-Ethiopia relations published in 2026, academic Maria Repnikova writes that Confucius Institute language learning services are offered free or low-cost to Ethiopians and they can provide scholarship opportunities or prospects of employment at Chinese companies.

=== Media ===
Chinese state media has agreements with various Ethiopian media to provide free access to Xinhua News Agency's news database. The Chinese embassy in Ethiopia provides training opportunities for Ethiopian journalists and sponsors donations of media technology to bodies like the Ethiopian News Agency. China Daily is delivered for free to many Ethiopian institutions.

== Economic relations ==
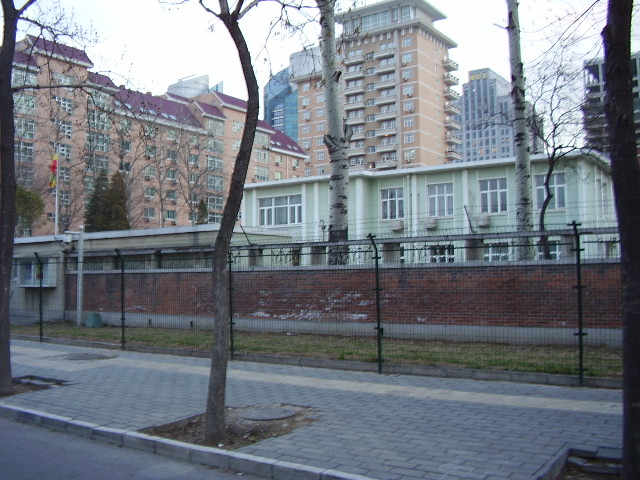
Ethiopian Embassy in Beijing

The economic relationship is multi-faceted. Between 2000 and 2014, China provided over $12 billion in loan finance (usually tied to infrastructure projects undertaken by Chinese firms). There is growing Chinese investment in the Ethiopian economy, while imports of cheap consumer goods from China ($3.4 billion in 2015) greatly exceeding exports from Ethiopia to China ($380 million in 2015). The Chinese appear to be interested in Ethiopia for political reasons (among African countries, its governance and developmental orientation is closest to that of China, and it hosts the African Union headquarters), and as a business partner. Ethiopia's focus on infrastructure has created numerous opportunities for Chinese construction firms. Ethiopia is also a significant market for Chinese exports that will expand as Ethiopia's rapid economic growth continues. For Ethiopia, Chinese finance provides critical support for the government's legitimacy, as electricity, transport, and employment opportunities continue to expand, stimulating economic growth and helping promote exports to other countries. China's "business is business" approach is welcome by comparison to western aid providers who often link their contributions to changes in the Ethiopian legal and political structure.

As China began a new town construction boom around 2010, the Chinese government and state-owned enterprises began developing new towns with African governments, including Ethiopia.

Ethiopia joined the Belt and Road Initiative (BRI) in 2018.

=== Direct aid ===
Chinese aid to Ethiopia has included dispatch of medical teams and teachers, and educational scholarships for Ethiopian students studying in China. Former Ethiopian President Mulatu Teshome was educated in China. China's aid program funded the construction of a vocational school in Ethiopia. Although the plan was to use Chinese vocational instructions, the school eventually switched to German instructors, with students learning skills including engineering, automobile, architecture and construction. In June 2009, the Chinese ambassador assisted in laying the foundation stone for the Tirunesh Dibaba Beijing Hospital, planned as a modern hospital 6000 square meters in size with 100 beds. The Chinese government is funding construction and will provide medical instruments and equipment. The hospital is named after Ethiopian runner Tirunesh Dibaba, who won two gold medals at the 2008 Beijing Olympics. The hospital was completed in November 2011 and handed over to the Ethiopian government. Fifteen Chinese medical personnel were sent to help their Ethiopian counterparts.

During the COVID-19 pandemic, China provided Ethiopia with medical equipment and testing supplies.

China supported the development of a military hospital in Bishoftu (opened in 2024), including Chinese medical equipment and China-trained medical practitioners. Chinese medical teams practice at the China-built Addis Ababa Silk Road General Hospital which provides free health care the local community and trains local medical practitioners.

The Chinese government has gifted the construction of various projects to Ethiopia, including several urban parks in Addis Adaba and its Science Museum.

=== Infrastructure Loans ===
Chinese government has also provided significant loans to Ethiopia, most of which are concessional. These are nearly all tied to construction projects to be undertaken by Chinese enterprises such as the Addis Ababa ring road opened in 2003.

Some Chinese-built projects are financed by the Ethiopian government. In 2002, for example, the Sino Hydro Corporation started work on the estimated US$224 million Tekeze hydroelectric project with a 607-foot dam on the Tekezé River due for completion in 2007. After delays due in part to problems with massive landslides, the project was completed for a final cost of US$365 million in July 2009 and should deliver 300 megawatts of power. In July 2009, Ethiopia signed further agreements with China for the Sino Hydro Corporation to build 2,150 megawatts of hydro-electric capacity with the Gibe IV (Omo River) and Halele Werabesa dams, in a deal worth US$2.67 billion. China will cover 85% of the project costs through preferential buyer's credit and concessionary loans. The environmentalist Richard Leakey has expressed concerns about the possible impact of the Omo river dams on Lake Turkana. The Export-Import Bank of China funded a railway from Addis Ababa to landlocked Ethiopia's main port in neighboring Djibouti, completed in 2016.

As of 2023, Ethiopia's was the second-largest African recipient of loans from China.

=== Investment and trade ===
Countries which signed cooperation documents related to the Belt and Road Initiative

Ethiopia is a particularly emphasized place where Chinese companies should "go out" to, with Chinese top leadership describing Ethiopia as a "bridge" between the Belt and Road Initiative (BRI) and Africa's development, as well as "a pilot country for China-Africa production capacity cooperation." It is a central hub for the BRI, with projects including the Addis-Djibouti Railway and the Addis Light Rail.

By 2009, direct Chinese investment in Ethiopia had reached US$900 million. Chinese firms investing in Ethiopia are generally greenfield investors. As of 2023, approximately 700 private Chinese firms invested in Ethiopia.

Exports from Ethiopia to China have grown from negligible levels before 2000 to around US$130 million in 2006, primarily in raw materials such as sesame seeds and partially finished leather. Meanwhile, exports from China to Ethiopia have grown from under US$50 million in 1996 to US$430 million in 2006, including low-priced clothing, machinery and electronics equipment. The Ethiopian government has encouraged imports, purchasing Chinese equipment and supplying it to local construction and manufacturing firms on a lease-to-buy basis. Trade continues to grow rapidly. By 2015 bilateral trade had grown to $3.8 billion, with Ethiopian exports encouraged through special quota and tariff arrangements on many goods. In a paper prepared for the OECD, economist Tegegne Gebre Egziabher of Addis Ababa University notes that in the short term, cheap Chinese imports may have damaged local producers. However, the longer term benefit may be to stimulate improvements in efficiency and quality. Chinese investment in local infrastructure may assist towards this outcome.

Publishing in 2019, academic Carlos Oya writes that Chinese companies in Ethiopia have a high degree of localization, including through the training and hiring of local workers.

Sinopec is a part owner of the joint venture POLY-GCL Petroleum, which as of 2023 is developing a $4 billion natural gas project in Ethiopia and which will include a pipeline to the Djiboutian coast and an export terminal. According to David H. Shinn and academic Joshua Eisenman, the project underscore China's commitment to expanding its import of liquefied natural gas from African countries.

== Space cooperation ==
The China Academy of Space Technology and Ethiopian engineers partnered to develop a remote-sensing microsatellite for Ethiopia, which China launched from the Taiyuan Satellite Launch Center in 2019. China provided a grant covering 75% of the project, financing training for Ethiopian engineers and the microsatellite itself. Ethiopia funded the construction of ground station facilities for the project. Ethiopia uses the satellite for environmental protection, weather forecasting, crop monitoring, natural resources applications, and earth observatory tasks.

China launched a second satellite for Ethiopia in 2020, this one a remote sensing satellite for natural disaster monitoring.

== Political relations ==
Ethiopia follows the one China principle. It recognizes the People's Republic of China as the sole government of China and Taiwan as an integral part of China's territory, and supports all efforts by the PRC to "achieve national reunification". It also considers Hong Kong, Xinjiang and Tibet to be China's internal affairs.

== The Abole incident ==
On 24 April 2007, fighters from the Ogaden National Liberation Front, a group of ethnic Somalis seeking independence from Ethiopia attacked workers at an exploratory oilfield in Abole, a small town about 120 km south of Jijiga in eastern Ethiopia. They killed about 65 Ethiopian and 9 Chinese workers, and kidnapped another 7 Chinese. The oilfield is run by a subsidiary of the government-owned China Petroleum and Chemical Corporation (Sinopec). A Sinopec spokesperson said that the incident would not discourage the firm from further exploration. The Chinese Foreign Ministry avoided discussing the attackers' motives beyond stating that they were attempting to sabotage China's relationship with Ethiopia. A Chinese team was dispatched to investigate the cause and look into ways of improving safety in the future.

== See also ==
- Foreign relations of the People's Republic of China
- Foreign relations of Ethiopia
- Sino-African relations
- Chinese people in Ethiopia
- AU Conference Center and Office Complex
- Addis Ababa–Djibouti Railway
- Addis Ababa Light Rail
- Addis Ababa–Adama Expressway
