= Chinese people in Kyrgyzstan =

Total population
- Various estimates

Regions with significant populations
- Bishkek, Naryn

Languages
- Chinese; many learning Russian as a second language; Kyrgyz among ethnic Kyrgyz immigrants; Dungan

Religion
- Chinese folk religion, Buddhism, Islam, atheism

Related ethnic groups
- Overseas Chinese, Dungan people

Chinese people in Kyrgyzstan have been growing in numbers since the late 1980s. 2008 police statistics showed 60,000 Chinese nationals living in the country. However, the 2009 census showed just 1,813 people who declared themselves to be of Chinese ethnicity.

== History ==
During the Mongol Empire, Han Chinese were moved to Central Asian areas like Besh Baliq, Almaliq, and Samarqand by the Mongols where they worked as artisans and farmers. The Daoist Chinese master Qiu Chuji travelled through Kyrgyzstan to meet Genghis Khan in Afghanistan.

As China and Kyrgyzstan are neighbouring countries, there is a long history of population movements between the lands that today make up their national territories. Between the 7th and 10th centuries, Chinese merchants and Buddhist monks travelled along the Silk Road, and crossed paths through what is now modern-day Kyrgyzstan. Between the 12th and 13th centuries, Kyrgyzstan was part of the Western Liao dynasty. Between the 17th and 20th centuries, eastern parts of Kyrgyzstan was under the rule of the Qing dynasty, during which large-scale migrations of Chinese Muslims from Northwest China fled to Kyrgyzstan; they also settled in Jetisu as well as the Ferghana Valley. In the early 20th century, Uyghurs, Dungans, and Han Chinese came to the Ferghana Valley as migrant workers in coal mines, cotton mills, and farms; some settled down permanently in Kyrgyzstan and intermarried with the local Kyrgyz people. The agricultural failures incurred during the 1950s Great Leap Forward spurred many people from Xinjiang to flee to the Soviet Union, including Kyrgyzstan, to escape hardships in China. However, as the Sino-Soviet split worsened, the border was closed and such migration made impossible.

Migration would begin again in the late 1980s, centred on Chüy Region, Bishkek and its surroundings; people from Xinjiang would come to rent land, and grow vegetables. Others came as cross-border traders, selling Chinese alcoholic beverages and buying up clothing—especially coats made from Karakul sheep pelts—for sale in Xinjiang. In the early 2000s, the majority of PRC nationals in Kyrgyzstan were of Uyghur ethnicity. However, since then, an increasing number of Han Chinese have been arriving.

Kyrgyzstan and other post-Soviet states are popular destinations for people from Xinjiang because they offer the opportunity to learn Russian, which has become important in urban job markets such as Urumqi. Recent migrants state they chose Kyrgyzstan as their destination, rather than join the large numbers of Chinese people in Russia or Kazakhstan, because Kyrgyzstan is cheaper, because Kyrgyz people often share phenotypical traits with the Chinese, and they perceive public safety as being better in Kyrgyzstan than in Russia where there have been cases of attacks on migrant workers.

== Business and employment ==
Chinese traders often employ local Dungans as assistants. Kyrgyz university students of all ethnicities also often seek out employment with Chinese traders, using their job as an opportunity to learn the Chinese language. On the outskirts of Bishkek, there is a large Chinese market, described as a "city within a city"; it has its own hospital, mosque, and apartment buildings.

Migrants from China also work in the construction sector, especially on housing projects for low-income people. President Kurmanbek Bakiyev once gave a speech praising the diligent Chinese workers and contrasting them harshly with local workers, whom he described as "lazy"; however, his speech provoked some resentment from average citizens. Construction company bosses also prefer Chinese workers because they are seen as less litigious than local workers, especially in the case of those living in the country illegally.

== Interethnic relations ==
There is a popular perception that many Chinese migrants seek to marry Kyrgyz women in order to obtain Kyrgyz citizenship; local people, especially the elderly, object to the women marrying men who are not Muslims. However, such marriages actually remain relatively rare.

Kyrgyz people complain that the Chinese specialists who run factories are secretive and do not wish to train local people how to operate the equipment; Kyrgyz are kept as low-level manual workers. Kyrgyzstani workers also blame unskilled Chinese migrants for taking jobs away from local people and thus forcing them to migrate to Russia to find work, where they themselves face the danger of violence motivated by xenophobia. Kyrgyz merchants have also organised protests against the Chinese traders.

There have been numerous incidents of xenophobic violence against Chinese migrants by ethnic Kyrgyz, including one in June 2002 which resulted in three deaths. During the 2010 riots in Bishkek which overthrew Kurmanbek Bakiyev's government, the Guoying Center, a prominent symbol of Chinese traders' presence in Kyrgyz's capital city, also became a target for mobs, who looted shops and burned the building. The Kyrgyz also violently targeted Uyghurs and Dungans during the same riots.

== Media ==
The Kyrgyzstan Overseas Chinese Newspaper (Chinese: 吉尔吉斯斯坦华侨报 / Jí'ěrjísīsītǎn huáqiáo bào / Хырхызстан Хуачё бо) began publication in 2006 as a semi-monthly newspaper; it had a circulation of roughly 3,000 as of 2009. It is printed in Xinjiang by the same department which publishes the Xinjiang Economic Daily.

== See also ==
- Kyrgyz in China
- China–Kyrgyzstan relations
- Chinese people in Kazakhstan
- Huimin bao
