= Chinese people in Morocco =

Ethnic diaspora group

Total population
- 3,000 (2014)

Regions with significant populations
- Casablanca

Languages
- Chinese, Arabic

Related ethnic groups
- Overseas Chinese

The Chinese people in Morocco are a small community of recent origin, their presence is the result of two very distinct migratory streams which maintain few relations between them. On the one hand, there are supervised migrations, mainly made up of expatriates who officiate in the diplomatic framework, in bilateral cooperation projects and more mainly within the large Chinese companies working in Morocco and whose development is intimately correlated to that of Sino-Moroccan bilateral relations. On the other side, we observe voluntary migrations involving small business entrepreneurs, engaged mostly in wholesale trading and retail.

The Chinese merchants have turned Derb Omar, one of Casablanca's largest commercial districts, into a hub where a Chinatown has emerged. In this district, the merchants run small retail shops which are often subdivisions of a narrow storefront.

== See also ==
- China–Morocco relations
- Chinese diaspora
- Demographics of Morocco
