= Xinjiang Economic Daily =

Simplified Chinese newspaper

The Xinjiang Economic Daily (Chinese: 新疆经济报; pinyin: Xīnjiāng Jīngjì Bào) is a state-run daily newspaper published in the Xinjiang autonomous region of the People's Republic of China. It is published in the Chinese language only. It is considered to be one of the most dynamic newspapers in China.

The department responsible for the Xinjiang Economic Daily also publish newspapers aimed at overseas Chinese in Kyrgyzstan (since 2006) and in Kazakhstan (since 2009).
