= Chinese people in Lesotho =

Total population
- 5,000 (2011 estimate)

Regions with significant populations
- Maseru

Related ethnic groups
- Overseas Chinese

As in much of Africa, there is an immigrant community of Chinese people in Lesotho primarily running small businesses.

== History ==
In 1991, a local woman was beaten to death by security guards at a South African-owned store. The event led to a nationalist outcry among the poor urban underclass in Maseru, who targeted foreign businesses run by South Koreans and Taiwanese, and also the businesses of Lesotho nationals of Indian descent.

In November 2007, rioting broke out in the capital as native traders attacked Chinese-owned businesses. Some opposition politicians and radio stations push an anti-Chinese position.

== Business ==
The Chinese are engaged in retail and textile manufacturing. Throughout Lesotho, in the smallest towns there are Chinese small businesses. One of the biggest domestic industries is textiles, a sector largely operated by Taiwanese expatriates.

== Integration and community ==
A report by The Economist noted that even in the "remotest" part of Lesotho, Mokhotlong, Chinese business owners had achieved a notable presence, operating a petrol station, the Hui Hua supermarket, the Hua Tai ironmonger, Ji Li Lai general store, Fu Zhong hardware and furniture wholesaler, and other businesses. The intention of the article was to illustrate that "even in the farthest backwaters of Africa, the Chinese are moving in."

The chairman of the Chinese Business Association of Lesotho argues that the Chinese are a well-integrated community who speak the local language and interact well with locals.

There are widespread complaints against Chinese businesses. A Lesotho Times editorial declared Chinese products are shoddy and businesses do not follow laws.
