= Chinese people in Mali =

Total population
- 3,000 (2014)

Regions with significant populations
- Bamako

Related ethnic groups
- Overseas Chinese

There is a small Chinese community in Mali of about 3,000 people, mostly living in the capital of Bamako. However, their economic impact is prominent. The Chinese have opened wholesale businesses, retail shops, small hotels and construction firms. The Chinese immigrants are also active in the healthcare sector, having opened private medical clinics.

== History ==
The first wave of Chinese immigrants arrived in Mali in the 1990s.

The community suffered a setback in 2005, when Chinese-owned stores were damaged and looted by rioters. However, the violence did not specifically target the Chinese, as other neighborhood businesses were also attacked.

== Integration and community ==
Local support for the Chinese community remains high. However, there has been local concern over the robust level of competition from Chinese retailers and construction firms. Locals fear that although Chinese competition lowers the cost of goods, it also deprives nationals of business opportunities.
