= Chinese people in Libya =

Chinese diaspora in Libya

Total population
- 340 (August 2014)

Languages
- Chinese

Related ethnic groups
- Overseas Chinese

The number of Chinese people in Libya has dramatically dwindled since 2011 after the outbreak of civil war. Commercial activity was destabilized by the civil war and violence that continued afterwards, forcing the evacuation of foreign residents including Chinese.

During the 2011 Civil War, over 35,000 Chinese nationals were evacuated. The large number of evacuees owes to the extensive participation of Chinese construction companies operating in Libya which employed Chinese engineers and workers. The successful evacuation of a large number was considered a success especially in comparison to Taiwan, which was unable to evacuate its citizens as quickly.

Libya returned to civil war in 2014 and Chinese nationals were evacuated again in May and August. In a statement from a Chinese embassy official reported by Xinhua on August 2, 2014, all but 340 Chinese nationals left the country.
