= Chinese people in the Republic of Congo =

Total population
- 15,000-25,000 (2013)

Regions with significant populations
- Brazzaville

Related ethnic groups
- Overseas Chinese

There is a large community of Chinese migrants residing in the Republic of Congo.

Several Chinese engineering firms work in Congo as contractors for major infrastructure projects and employ Chinese construction workers as a part of the overall workforce. At a Beijing Construction Engineering Group construction site in March 2012 in Brazzaville, 6 Chinese workers were killed and dozens injured when a blast occurred after a fire at a munitions depot devastated the adjacent neighborhood.

== Notable people ==
- Yang Fen, table tennis player (2008 Olympics)
- Han Xing, table tennis player (2012 and 2016 Olympics)
- Wang Jianan, table tennis player (2016 Olympics)
