= Chinese people in Uganda =

Total population
- 7,000 (2010 estimate)

Related ethnic groups
- Overseas Chinese

The number of Chinese residents in Uganda has rapidly expanded in the 2000s along with the rise of trade ties.

== Trade ==
The rapid expansions in trade relations begins in 2005 when Chinese investments in Uganda only included a hotel and restaurant. By 2010, China's investments shot up so much that it ranked second to the United Kingdom.

However the increased trade and number of residents has caused a backlash. The influx of shopkeepers from China has caused consternation among Ugandans who compete in retail. In July 2011, Ugandan shopkeepers in Kampala ordered a work stoppage to protest against rising prices, an unstable exchange rate, and a flood of competition by Chinese and Indian traders. The organizers of the strike, the Kampala City Traders Association, named "aliens doing petty trade, especially the Chinese" as a source of concern.

Other areas of trade include construction of buildings, fiber optics, and a road. Projects being built by the Chinese government include "a hospital in Kampala, an agricultural demonstration center, and a government office block building."

== Integration and community ==
Chinese investors founded the China Enterprises Chamber of Commerce in Uganda in March 2009 a trade organization composed of over 30 firms.
