= Chinese people in Cape Verde =

Regions with significant populations
- Praia, São Vicente

Religion
- Atheism

Related ethnic groups
- Overseas Chinese, Macanese people

Chinese people in Cape Verde are a community of entrepreneurial migrants who settled on the archipelago beginning in the 1990s to start retail shops. Their presence as immigrants is notable in a country that is known for sending emigrants abroad.

== History ==
Chinese migrants did not settle in large numbers during the country's period under Portuguese colonial rule. Although bilateral diplomatic relations were established in 1975, there was little migration with a Chinese restaurant operating from the late 1980s to 2002.

The marked influx of Chinese began in 1995 when the first Chinese store opened in Praia, the capital. Many of these shops, called baihuo shops by the shopkeepers and loja chineˆs or Chinese shops by the Cape Verdean consumers, would follow due to the pull of chain migration primarily from the region of Wenzhou, Zhejiang.
