= China–Morocco relations =

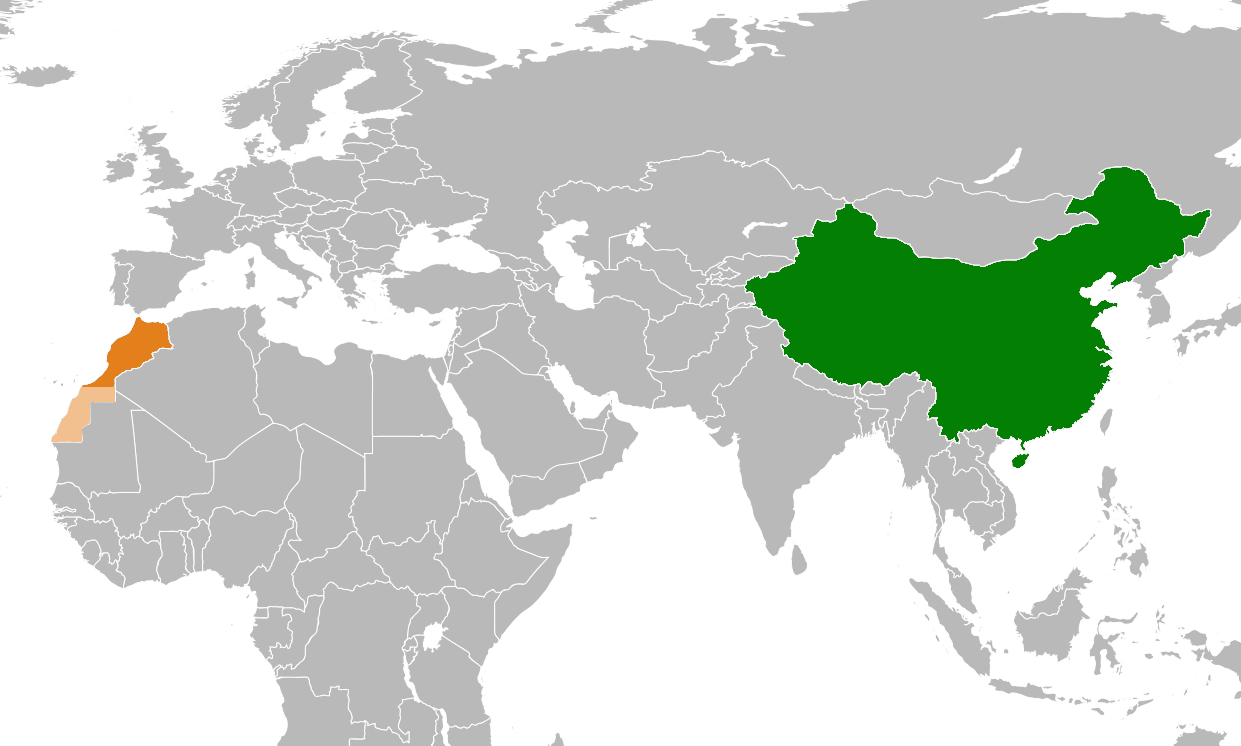
- China: Morocco

Diplomatic mission
- Embassy of China, Rabat: Embassy of Morocco, Beijing

The People's Republic of China and Morocco established diplomatic relations on November 1, 1958. In 2016, Morocco established a strategic partnership with China.

== History ==
Du Huan, a Chinese traveler in the Tang dynasty, once traveled to the Maghreb region at that time. Moroccan Traveler, Scientist and adventurer, Ibn Battuta and Chinese traveller Wang Dayuan during Yuan dynasty visited each other's Continent (Respectively Africa and Asia) almost at the same time.

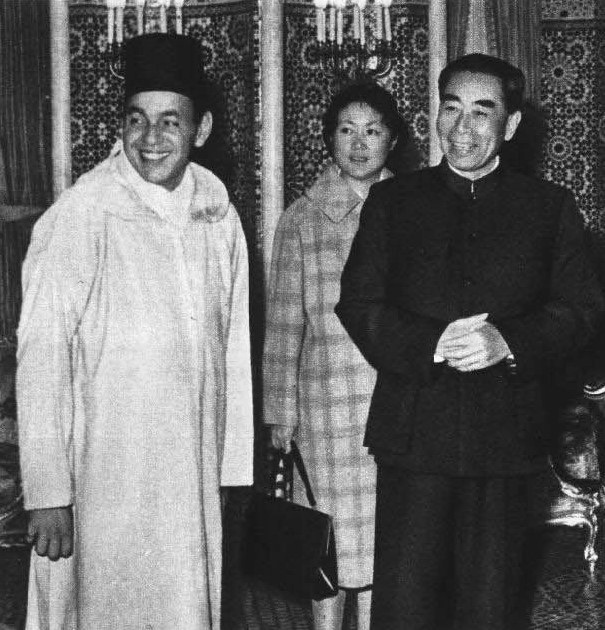
Hassan II and Zhou Enlai in 1964.

Morocco and the People's Republic of China established formal relations on November 1, 1958. China's relations with Morocco contributed to China's sympathetic view of the Algerian revolution.

By its stability, geographic location and millenary friendship, the vision of Morocco in China shifted in the recent years from a solid cooperation to a strategic win-win partnership. Morocco's strategic choice based on diversifying its partners is reaffirmed during the official visit of King Mohammed VI to China in 2016. This visit enabled the strengthening of political relations between the two countries, based on the principles of friendship, understanding, solidarity, and a common will to diversify areas of bilateral cooperation. A global strategic partnership between the Kingdom and the People's Republic of China was also signed during the visit, followed in 2017 by an agreement dedicated to the Chinese Silk Road and Belt Initiative.Relations have continued to be strong into the 2020s, with the Chinese special envoy for the Middle East, Zhai Jun, visiting in 2022.

== Economic and trade exchanges ==
In 1995, both countries signed their comprehensive Economic and Trade agreement, enforced in 1999.

From 2000 to 2012, there are approximately 36 Chinese official development finance projects identified in Morocco through various media reports. These projects range from a $248 million MOU with the Export-Import Bank of China to build the Berchid-Beni Mellal highway in 2011, to a CNY 150 million preferential loan agreement in Rabat to build and equip eight private general hospitals in various regions in Morocco.

In November 2016, Morocco announced it is currently planning to develop a new economic hub in the north of the country, with the assistance of development organisations and Chinese multinationals, including the international aeronautics firm Haite Group, Morocco-China International and BMCE Bank of Africa. The project is projected to cost $US11 billion.

Trade exchanges increased considerably during the years and China became the 4th commercial partner of the country in 2018, representing 6,6% of Moroccan exchanges. This new dynamic regarding economic relations between the countries was illustrated by the visit in 2016 of His Majesty King Mohamed VI in Beijing and the signature of numerous agreements in multiple sectors, including energy, mining, infrastructures, industry and investment.

Morocco signed a Belt and Road Initiative (BRI) memorandum of understanding with China in 2017. In January 2022, Morocco and China have enhanced their cooperation as they signed the joint BRI implementation plan, Morocco became the first country in North Africa to sign comprehensive cooperation with China.

Chinese nationals are exempt from visa for Morocco, for a maximum stay of 90 days. Morocco becomes a popular destination for more and more Chinese tourists.

== Health ==
At the onset of the COVID-19 pandemic, Morocco sent medical protection equipment to China. On 22 March 2020, Morocco received Chinese donations (masks, ventilators and other medical equipment) to support its fight against COVID-19. In January 2021, Morocco received its first shipments of vaccine doses from Chinese state-owned Sinopharm, as well as AstraZeneca. Sinopharm carried out tests of its vaccine in Morocco in 2020, as part of China's global vaccine diplomacy efforts. Morocco says it eventually plans to produce the jab locally.

== Sovereignty issues ==
Morocco follows the one China principle. It recognizes the People's Republic of China as the sole government of China and Taiwan as an integral part of China's territory, and supports all efforts by the PRC to "achieve national reunification". It also considers Hong Kong, Xinjiang and Tibet to be China's internal affairs.

In June 2020, Morocco was one of 53 countries that backed the Hong Kong national security law at the United Nations. In October 2020, Morocco was one of 46 countries that signed a joint statement supporting China's Xinjiang policies.

== Western Sahara conflict ==
With regard to the issue of Western Sahara conflict, as a permanent member of the UN Security Council, China supported Resolution 2240 in 2018 and resolution 2602 in 2021, which urged all parties to resume dialogue, in good faith, towards a just, lasting and mutually acceptable political solution, "which will provide for the self determination of the people of Western Sahara", Zhang Jun, the Chinese representative to the UN encouraged the new Envoy to push forward with the political process, adding that his country will continue to hold an objective and fair position on the issue. China abstained from voting on Resolution 2797 at the United Nations Security Council on 31 October 2025, citing "imbalances" in the resolution drafted by the United States, which endorsed Morocco's 2007 Autonomy Proposal to resolve the conflict. Morocco considered China's position "a diplomatic victory".

== Education ==
Three Confucius Institutes were established in Morocco, the first in March 2008 at the Mohammed V University, the second in May 2012 at University of Hassan II Casablanca, and the third at the Abdelmalek Essaâdi University in September 2016.

== Defense cooperation ==
The Al-Khalid tank jointly developed by China and Pakistan as the main ground equipment in Morocco. China North Industries Group Corporation Limited — commonly referred to as NORINCO — delivered 24 Sky Dragon 50 medium-range surface-to-air missiles to Morocco in December 2017. HQ-9 (FD-2000B) surface-to-air defense missile systems deployed at military bases in Morocco's eastern provinces.

== Diplomatic missions ==
=== Chinese Embassy ===
The Chinese embassy is located in Rabat.

- Ambassador Changlin Li

=== Moroccan Embassy ===
The Moroccan embassy is located in Beijing.

- Ambassador Aziz Mekouar

== Extradition ==
China has an extradition treaty with Morocco.

== See also ==
- Foreign relations of China
- Foreign relations of Morocco
