= Overseas Chinese =

Ethnic Chinese residing outside of China

海外華人，海外华人; 海外中國人，海外中国人

Total population
- 60,000,000; 10,500,000 (born in mainland China, 2023)

Regions with significant populations
- Thailand: 9,392,792 (2012)
- Malaysia: 7,527,793 (2020)
- United States: 5,457,033 (2023)
- Indonesia: 3,280,000 (2020)
- Singapore: 2,675,521 (2020)
- Peru: 2,500,000 (2020)
- Myanmar: 1,725,794 (2011)
- Canada: 1,715,770 (2021)
- Australia: 1,390,637 (2021)
- Philippines: 1,350,000 (2013)
- Japan: 1,200,000 (2025)
- South Korea: 1,070,566 (2018)

Languages
- Standard Chinese, Cantonese, other Varieties of Chinese, English language, other languages of countries of residence

Religion
- Irreligion; Buddhism; Taoism; Christianity; Islam; Other

An Overseas Chinese person is a person of Chinese ancestry or is a person of full or partial Chinese origin whose ancestry is traced back to Greater China but is living and working outside of Greater China (mainland China, Hong Kong, Macau, and Taiwan). This term generally applies to both people of Chinese ancestry and citizens abroad.

As of 2026, approximately 40 million ethnic Chinese live abroad. As of 2023, there were 10.5 million people living outside mainland China who were born in mainland China, corresponding to 0.7 percent of China's population. Overall, China has a low percent of its population living overseas.

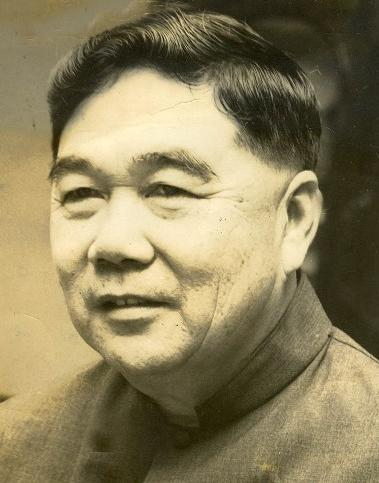
Guyana President Arthur Chung was the first ethnic Chinese President of Guyana.

== Terminology ==
Huáqiáo (simplified Chinese: 华侨; traditional Chinese: 華僑) often refers to people of Chinese citizenship residing outside of either the People's Republic of China (China) or Republic of China (Taiwan). The extent to which the term focuses on citizenship or is more loosely defined varies both across a range of official usage and varies across a range of informal usage.

The government of China realized that the overseas Chinese could be an asset, a source of foreign investment and a bridge to overseas knowledge; thus, it began to recognize the use of the term Huáqiáo. Qiáo means "to sojurn", and the loosely classified term huáqiáo often refers to those viewed as both ethnically and culturally Chinese (huá) who have settled abroad.

Beginning in the 1950s, the PRC focused its definition of overseas Chinese to refer to Chinese abroad who had not acquired foreign citizenship. This responded to diplomatic concerns of countries with large communities of ethnic Chinese residents like Indonesia, Malaysia, Thailand, and the Philippines. PRC official discourses then increased the extent to which they distinguished overseas Chinese from "Chinese with foreign nationality."

The modern informal internet term haigui (海归; 海歸) refers to returned overseas Chinese and guīqiáo qiáojuàn (归侨侨眷; 歸僑僑眷) to their returning relatives.

Huáyì (华裔; 華裔) refers to people of Chinese descent or ancestry residing outside of China, regardless of citizenship. Another often-used term is 海外華人; Hǎiwài Huárén or simply 華人; Huárén. It is often used by the Government of the People's Republic of China to refer to people of Chinese ethnicities who live outside the PRC, regardless of citizenship (they can become citizens of the country outside China by naturalization).

Overseas Chinese who are southerners, such as the Toisanese, Cantonese or Hokkiens refer to themselves as 唐人 (Tángrén). (Note: Jyutping: tong4 jan4; Pe̍h-ōe-jī: Tn̂g-lâng; Hakka: Tong nyin) Literally, it means Tang people, a reference to Tang dynasty China when it was ruling. This term is commonly used by the Cantonese as a colloquial reference to southern Han people and has little relevance to the ancient dynasty. For example, in the early 1850s when Chinese shops opened on Sacramento St. in San Francisco, California, United States, the Chinese emigrants, mainly from the Pearl River Delta west of Canton, called it Tang People Street (唐人街) (Note: pinyin: Tángrénjiē; Jyutping: tong4 jan4 gaai1) and the settlement became known as Tang People Town (唐人埠) (Note: pinyin: Tángrénbù; Jyutping: tong4 jan4 fau4) or Chinatown.

The term shǎoshù mínzú (少数民族; 少數民族) is added to the various terms for the overseas Chinese to indicate those who would be considered ethnic minorities in China. The terms shǎoshù mínzú huáqiáo huárén and shǎoshù mínzú hǎiwài qiáobāo (少数民族海外侨胞; 少數民族海外僑胞) are all in usage. The Overseas Chinese Affairs Office of the PRC does not distinguish between Han and ethnic minority populations for official policy purposes. For example, members of the Tibetan people may travel to China on passes granted to certain people of Chinese descent. Various estimates of the Chinese emigrant minority population include 3.1 million (1993), 3.4 million (2004), 5.7 million (2001, 2010), or approximately one tenth of all Chinese emigrants (2006, 2011). Cross-border ethnic groups (跨境民族; kuàjìng mínzú) are not considered Chinese emigrant minorities unless they left China after the establishment of an independent state on China's border.

Some ethnic groups who have historic connections with China, such as the Hmong, may not or may identify themselves as Chinese.

== History ==
The Chinese people have a long history of migration to overseas territories, as far back as the 10th century. One of the migrations dates back to the Ming dynasty when Zheng He (1371–1435), a Chinese man of Iranian ancestry, became the envoy of the Ming empire. He sent people – many of them Cantonese and Hokkien – to explore and trade in the South China Sea and in the Indian Ocean. It was during this time that the Malacca Strait and Malacca Sultanate developed as a maritime hub in the newly established Maritime Silk Road.

=== Early emigration ===
In the mid-1800s, outbound migration from China increased as a result of the European colonial powers opening up treaty ports. The British colonization of Hong Kong further created the opportunity for Chinese labor to be exported to plantations and mines.

During the era of European colonialism, many overseas Chinese were coolie laborers. Chinese capitalists overseas often functioned as economic and political intermediaries between colonial rulers and colonial populations.

The area of Taishan, Guangdong Province was the source for many of economic migrants. In the provinces of Fujian and Guangdong in China, there was a surge in emigration as a result of the poverty and village ruin.

San Francisco and California was an early American destination in the mid-1800s because of the California Gold Rush. Many settled in San Francisco forming one of the earliest Chinatowns. For the countries in North America and Australia saw great numbers of Chinese gold diggers finding gold in the gold mining and railway construction. Widespread famine in Guangdong impelled many Cantonese to work in these countries to improve the living conditions of their relatives.

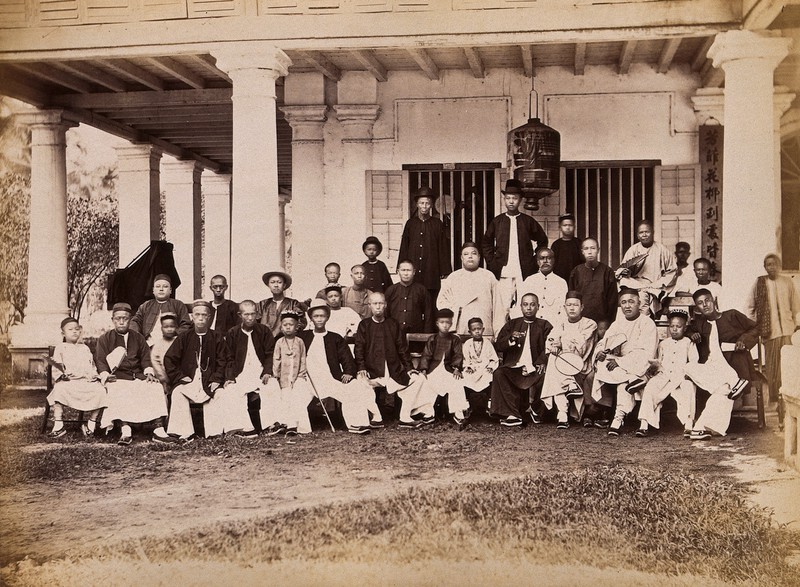
Chinese merchants in Penang, Straits Settlements (present-day Malaysia), c. 1881.

From 1853 until the end of the 19th century, about 18,000 Chinese were brought as indentured workers to the British West Indies, mainly to British Guiana (now Guyana), Trinidad and Jamaica. Their descendants today are found among the current populations of these countries, but also among the migrant communities with Anglo-Caribbean origins residing mainly in the United Kingdom, the United States and Canada.

Some overseas Chinese were sold to South America during the Punti–Hakka Clan Wars (1855–1867) in the Pearl River Delta in Guangdong.

Research conducted in 2008 by German researchers who wanted to show the correlation between economic development and height, used a small dataset of 159 male labourers from Guangdong who were sent to the Dutch colony of Suriname to illustrate their point. They stated that the Chinese labourers were between 161 to 164 cm in height for males. Their study did not account for factors other than economic conditions and acknowledge the limitations of such a small sample.

The Lanfang Republic in West Kalimantan was established by overseas Chinese.

In 1909, the Qing dynasty established the first Nationality Law of China. This law granted Chinese citizenship to anyone born to a Chinese parent. It permitted some dual citizenship. Among the purposes of the law was an effort by the Qing government to preserve its view of Chinese culture and tradition by positioning itself as a protector of overseas Chinese.

Prior to this law, the Qing government had refused to recognize the acquired nationalities of Chinese who went abroad.

=== Republic of China (1912–1949) ===
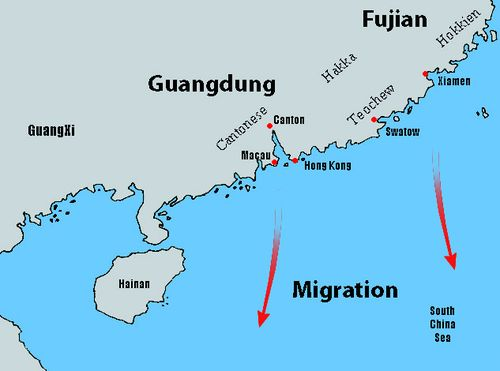
Main sources of Chinese migration from the 19th century to 1949.

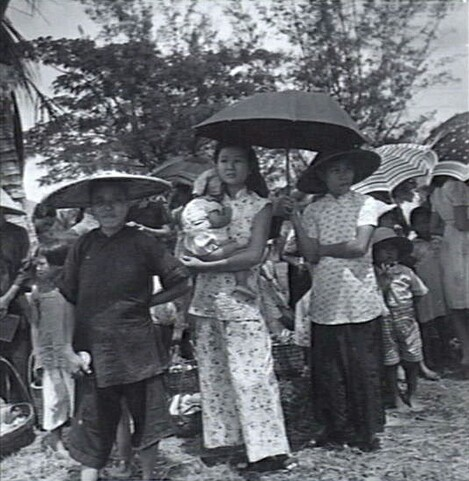
Chinese women and children in Brunei, c. 1945.

In the first half of the 20th Century, war and revolution accelerated the pace of migration out of China. The Kuomintang and the Communist Party competed for political support from overseas Chinese.

The military conflicts and economic mayhem under the Beiyang and Nationalist rule pushed increasing numbers of people to migrate, mostly through the coastal regions via the ports of Fujian, Guangdong, Hainan and Shanghai. These migrations are considered to be among the largest in China's history. Many nationals of the Republic of China fled and settled down overseas mainly between 1911 and 1949 before the Nationalist government led by Kuomintang lost the mainland to Communist revolutionaries and relocated. Most of the nationalist and neutral refugees fled mainland China to North America while others fled to Southeast Asia (Singapore, Brunei, Thailand, Malaysia, Indonesia and Philippines).

=== After World War II ===
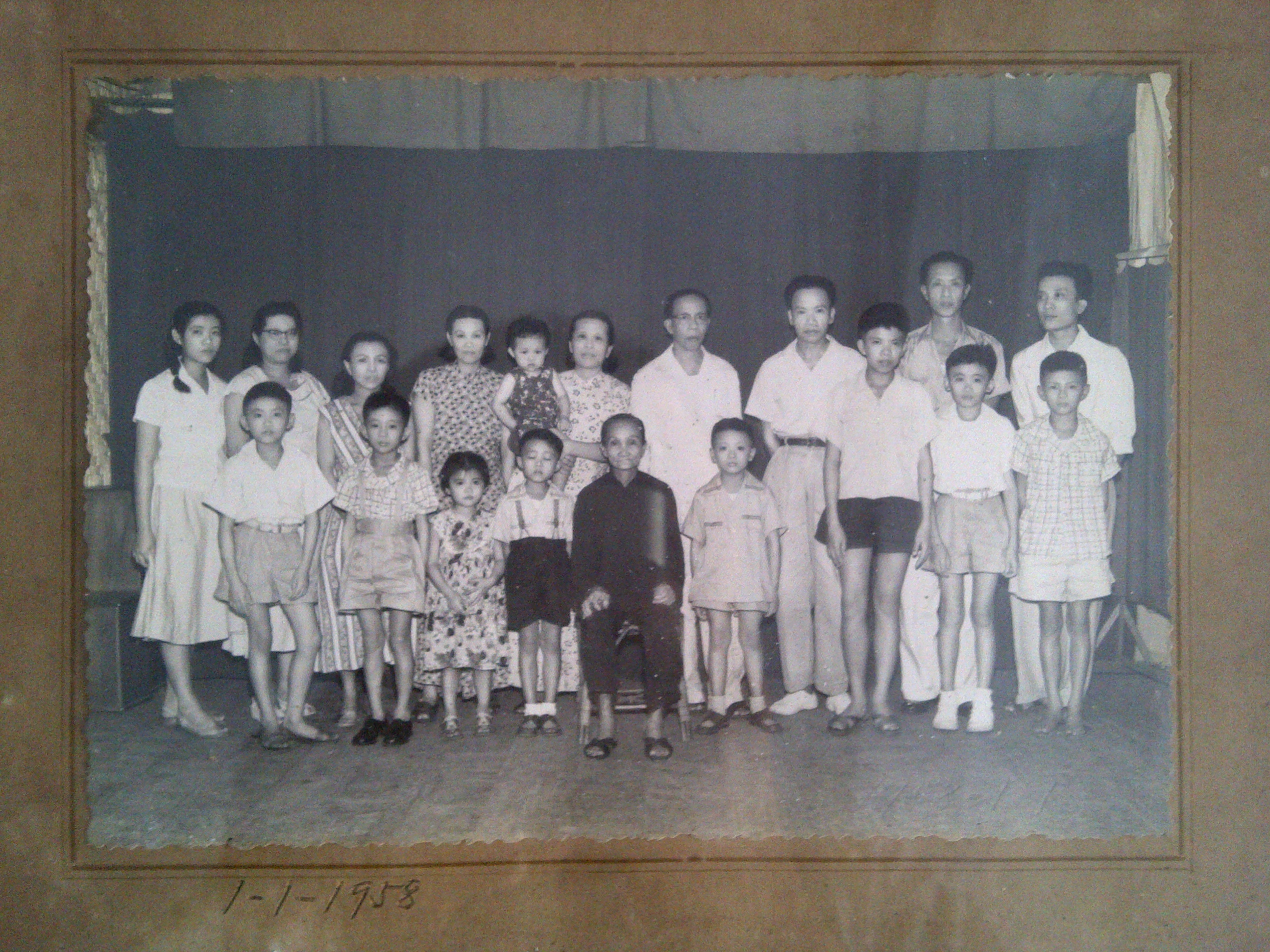
1958 old photograph of Indonesian-Chinese of Gu (古) surname, first until third generations

Those who fled during 1912–1949 and settled down in Singapore and Malaysia automatically gained citizenship in 1957 and 1963 as these countries gained independence. Kuomintang members who settled in Malaysia and Singapore played a major role in the establishment of the Malaysian Chinese Association and their meeting hall at Sun Yat Sen Villa. There was evidence that some intended to reclaim mainland China from the CCP by funding the Kuomintang.

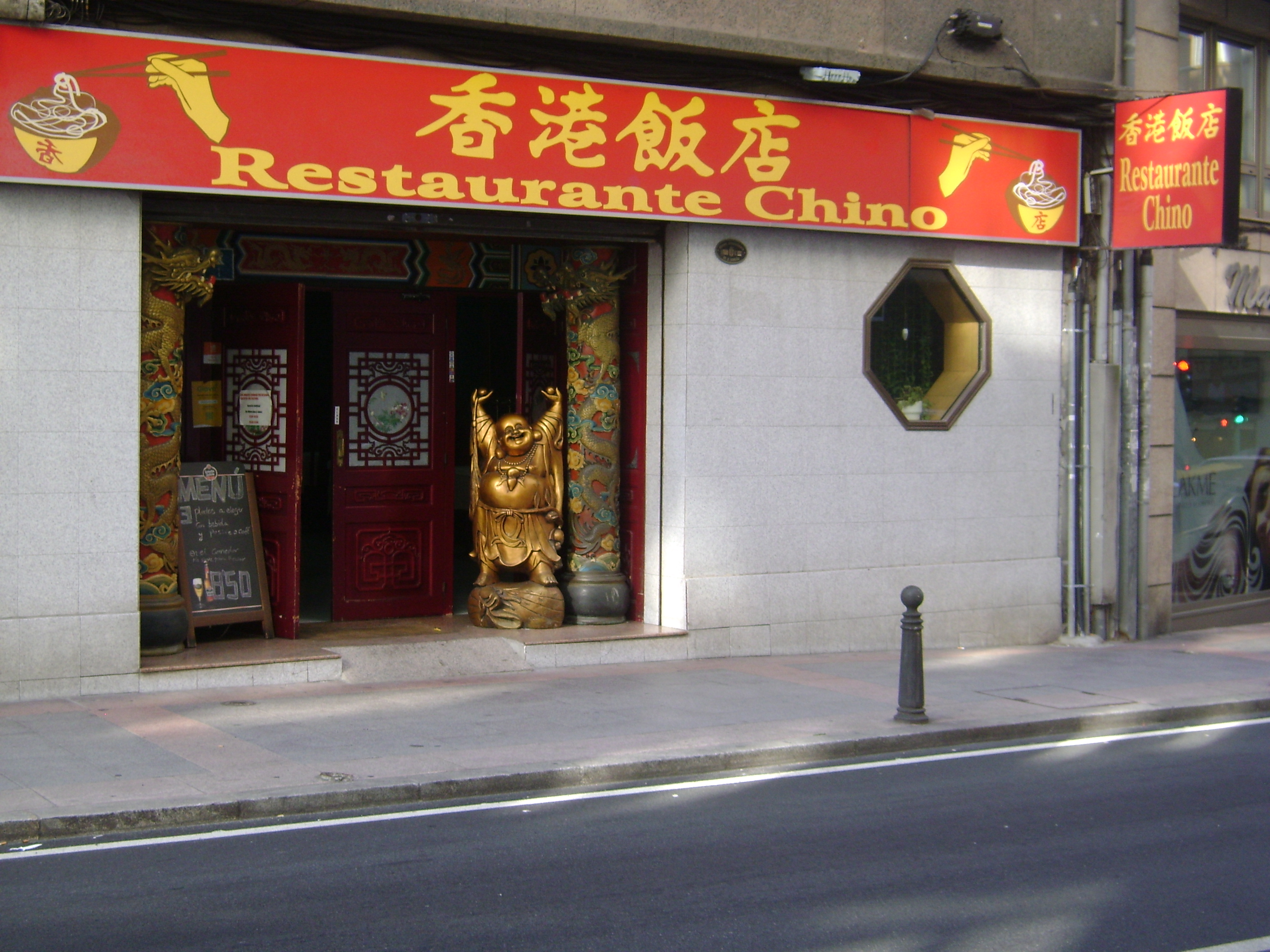
Chinese restaurant in La Coruña, Galicia, Spain.

After their defeat in the Chinese Civil War, parts of the Nationalist army retreated south and crossed the border into Burma as the People's Liberation Army entered Yunnan. The United States supported these Nationalist forces because the United States hoped they would harass the People's Republic of China from the southwest, thereby diverting Chinese resources from the Korean War. The Burmese government protested and international pressure increased. Beginning in 1953, several rounds of withdrawals of the Nationalist forces and their families were carried out. In 1960, joint military action by China and Burma expelled the remaining Nationalist forces from Burma, although some went on to settle in the Burma–Thailand borderlands.

During the 1950s and 1960s, the ROC tended to seek the support of overseas Chinese communities through branches of the Kuomintang based on Sun Yat-sen's use of expatriate Chinese communities to raise money for his revolution. During this period, the People's Republic of China tended to view overseas Chinese with suspicion as possible capitalist infiltrators and tended to value relationships with Southeast Asian nations as more important than gaining support of overseas Chinese, and in the Bandung declaration explicitly stated that overseas Chinese owed primary loyalty to their home nation.

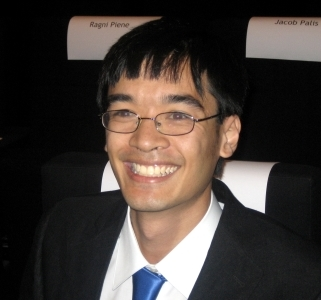
Fields Medalist Terence Tao is an Australian-born ethnic Chinese mathematician working in California.

From the mid-20th century onward, emigration has been directed primarily to Western countries such as the United States, Australia, Canada, Brazil, The United Kingdom, New Zealand, Argentina and the nations of Western Europe; as well as to Peru, Panama, and to a lesser extent to Mexico. Many of these emigrants who entered Western countries were themselves overseas Chinese, particularly from the 1950s to the 1980s, a period during which the PRC placed severe restrictions on the movement of its citizens. Due to the political dynamics of the Cold War, there was relatively little migration from the People's Republic of China to southeast Asia from the 1950s until the mid-1970s.Statistics show that between 1949 and 1978, Qingtian, a county in Zhejiang known for its large diasporan communities abroad, only permitted 752 people to go abroad throughout this entire period.

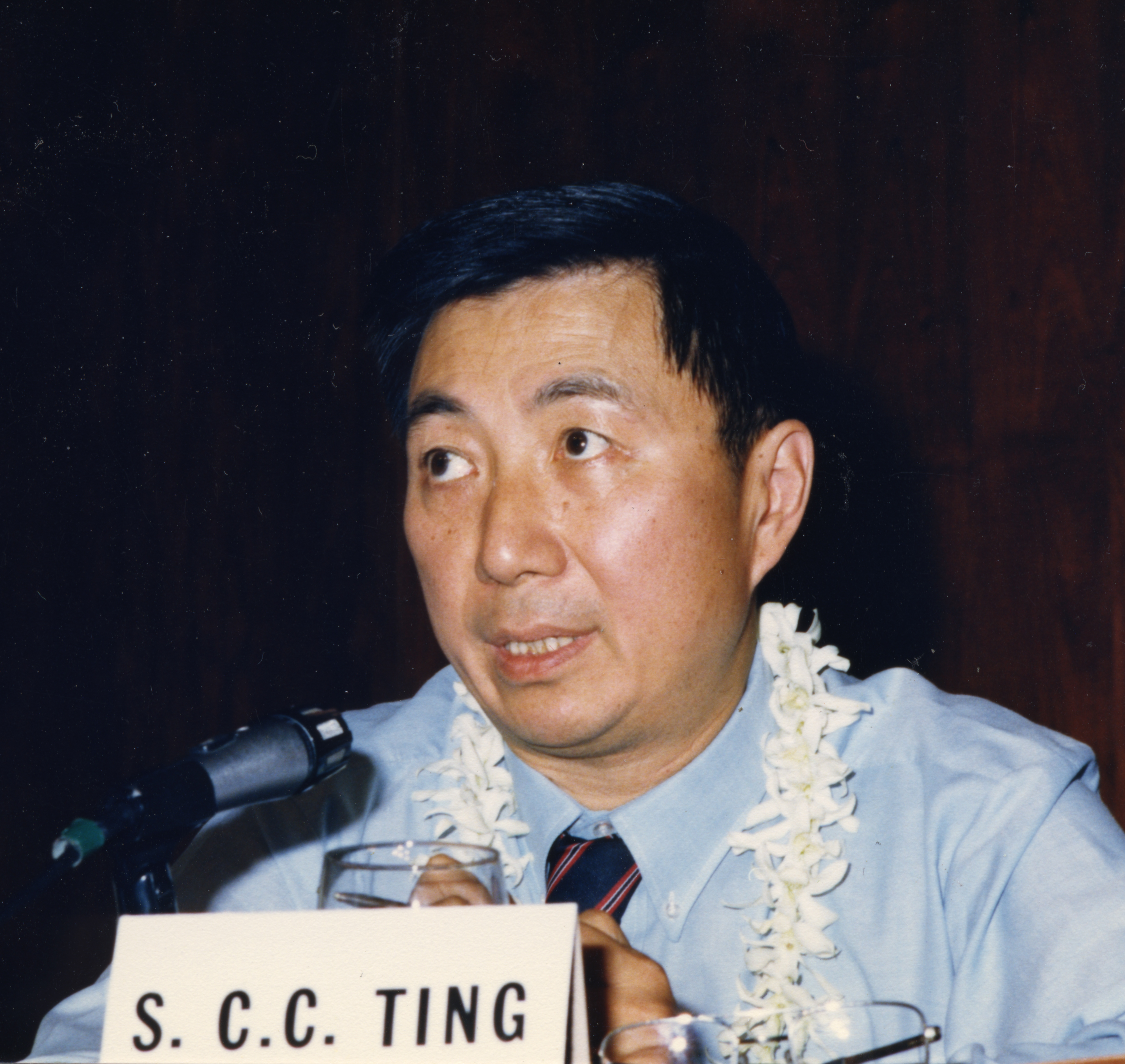
Nobel laureate Samuel Ting traces his ancestry to Shandong peninsula.

In 1984, Britain agreed to transfer the sovereignty of Hong Kong to the PRC; this triggered another wave of migration to the United Kingdom (mainly England), Australia, Canada, US, South America, Europe and other parts of the world. The 1989 Tiananmen Square protests and massacre further accelerated the migration. The wave calmed after Hong Kong's transfer of sovereignty in 1997. In addition, many citizens of Hong Kong hold citizenships or have current visas in other countries so if the need arises, they can leave Hong Kong at short notice. In recent years, the People's Republic of China has built increasingly stronger ties with African nations. In 2014, author Howard French estimated that over one million Chinese have moved in the past 20 years to Africa.

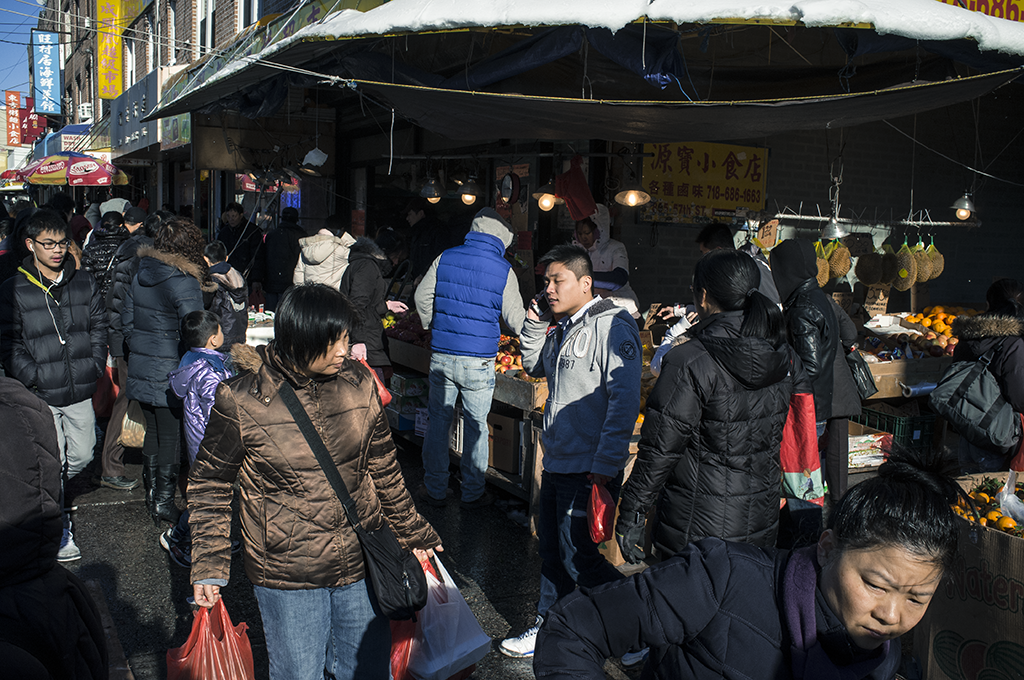
Typical grocery store on 8th Avenue in one of the Brooklyn Chinatowns in New York City, New York

Multiple Chinatowns in Manhattan, Queens, and Brooklyn are thriving as traditionally urban enclaves, as large-scale Chinese immigration continues into New York. The New York metropolitan area contains the largest ethnic Chinese population outside of Asia, comprising an estimated 893,697 uniracial individuals as of 2017. An estimated 15,000 to 30,000 Chinese live in Austria.

More recent Chinese presences have developed in Europe, where they number well over 1 million, and in Russia, they number over 200,000, concentrated in the Russian Far East. Russia's main Pacific port and naval base of Vladivostok, once closed to foreigners and belonged to China until the late 19th century, as of 2010 bristles with Chinese markets, restaurants and trade houses. A growing Chinese community in Germany consists of around 76,000 people as of 2010.

== Experience ==
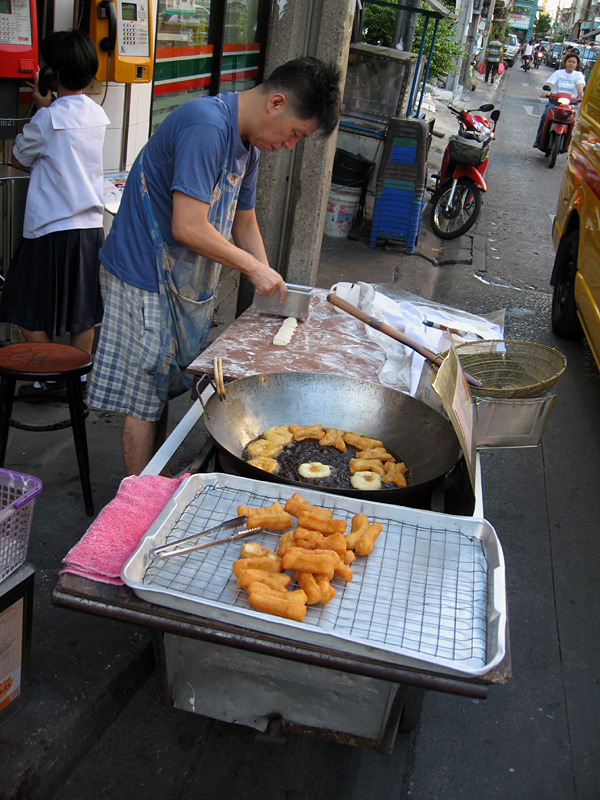
Thai Chinese in the past set up small enterprises such as street vending to eke out a living.

=== Commercial success ===
Chinese emigrants are estimated to control US$2 trillion in liquid assets and have considerable amounts of wealth to stimulate economic power in China. The Chinese business community of Southeast Asia, known as the bamboo network, has a prominent role in the region's private sectors. In Europe, North America and Oceania, occupations are diverse and impossible to generalize; ranging from catering to significant ranks in medicine, the arts and academia.

Overseas Chinese often send remittances back home to family members to help better them financially and socioeconomically. China ranks second after India of top remittance-receiving countries in 2018 with over US$67 billion sent.

=== Assimilation ===
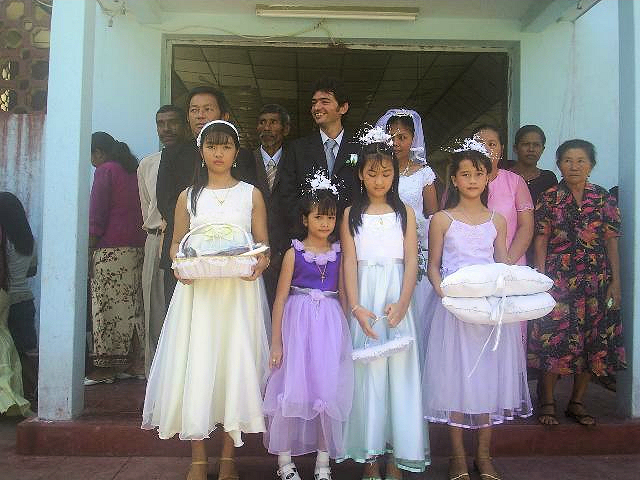
Chinese girls in a wedding in East Timor, 2006

Overseas Chinese communities vary widely as to their degree of assimilation, their interactions with the surrounding communities (see Chinatown), and their relationship with China.

Thailand has the largest overseas Chinese community and is also the most successful case of assimilation, with many claiming Thai identity. For over 400 years, descendants of Thai Chinese have largely intermarried and assimilated with their compatriots. The present royal house of Thailand, the Chakri dynasty, was founded by King Rama I who himself was partly of Chinese ancestry. His predecessor, King Taksin of the Thonburi Kingdom, was the son of a Chinese immigrant from Guangdong Province and was born with a Chinese name. His mother, Lady Nok-iang (Thai: นกเอี้ยง), was Thai (and was later awarded the noble title of Somdet Krom Phra Phithak Thephamat).

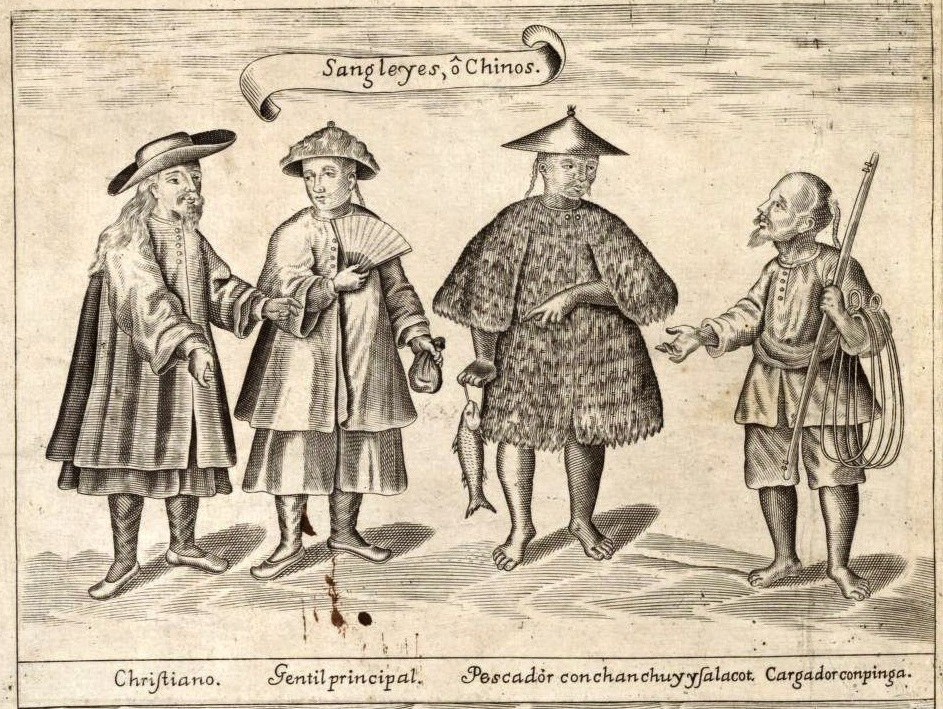
Sangleys, of different religion and social classes, as depicted in the Carta Hydrographica y Chorographica de las Yslas Filipinas (1734)

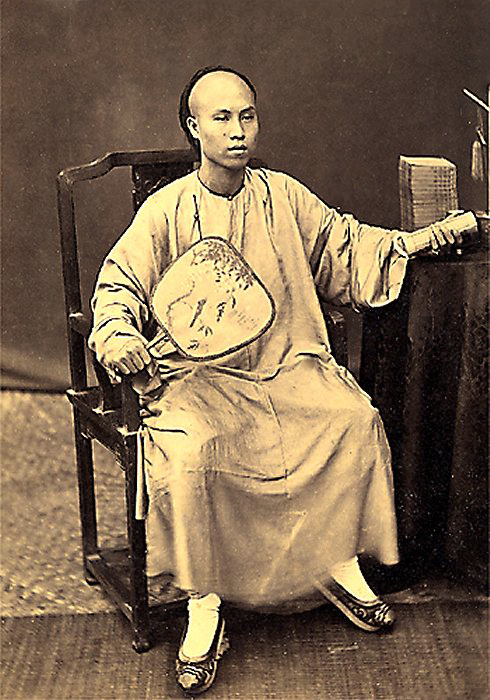
A Chinese Vietnamese merchant in Hanoi, c. 1885.

In the Philippines, the Chinese, known as the Sangley, from Fujian and Guangdong were already migrating to the islands as early as 9th century, where many have largely intermarried with both native Filipinos and Spanish Filipinos (Tornatrás). Early presence of Chinatowns in overseas communities start to appear in Spanish colonial Philippines around 16th century in the form of Parians in Manila, where Chinese merchants were allowed to reside and flourish as commercial centers, thus Binondo, a historical district of Manila, has become the world's oldest Chinatown. Under Spanish colonial policy of Christianization, assimilation and intermarriage, their colonial mixed descendants would eventually form the bulk of the middle class which would later rise to the Principalía and illustrado intelligentsia, which carried over and fueled the elite ruling classes of the American period and later independent Philippines. Chinese Filipinos play a considerable role in the economy of the Philippines and descendants of Sangley compose a considerable part of the Philippine population. Ferdinand Marcos, the former president of the Philippines was of Chinese descent, as were many others.

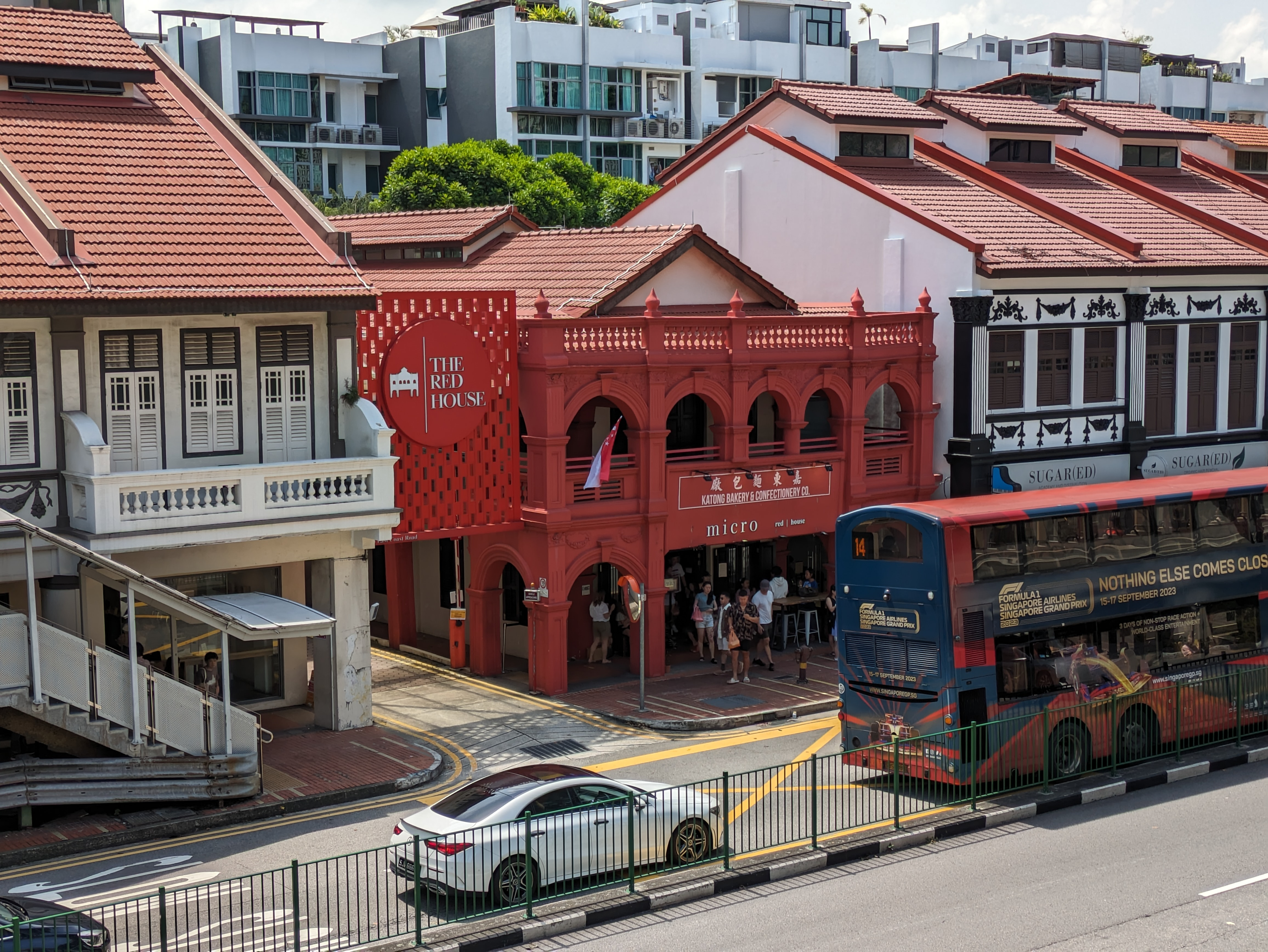
Since their early migration, many of the overseas Chinese of Malay ancestry have adopted local culture, especially in Indonesia, Malaysia, Singapore and Thailand with large Peranakan community. Most of them in Singapore were once concentrated in Katong.

Myanmar shares a long border with China so ethnic minorities of both countries have cross-border settlements. These include the Kachin, Shan, Wa, and Ta'ang.

In Cambodia, between 1965 and 1993, people with Chinese names were prevented from finding governmental employment, leading to a large number of people changing their names to a local, Cambodian name. Ethnic Chinese were one of the minority groups targeted by Pol Pot's Khmer Rouge during the Cambodian genocide.

Indonesia forced Chinese people to adopt Indonesian names after the Indonesian mass killings of 1965–66.

In Vietnam, all Chinese names can be pronounced by Sino-Vietnamese readings. For example, the name of the previous paramount leader Hú Jǐntāo (胡錦濤) would be spelled as "Hồ Cẩm Đào" in Vietnamese. There are also great similarities between Vietnamese and Chinese traditions such as the use Lunar New Year, philosophy such as Confucianism, Taoism and ancestor worship; leads to some Hoa people adopt easily to Vietnamese culture, however many Hoa still prefer to maintain Chinese cultural background. The official census from 2009 accounted the Hoa population at some 823,000 individuals and ranked 6th in terms of its population size. 70% of the Hoa live in cities and towns, mostly in Ho Chi Minh city while the rests live in the southern provinces.

On the other hand, in Malaysia, Singapore, and Brunei, the ethnic Chinese have maintained a distinct communal identity.

In East Timor, a large fraction of Chinese are of Hakka descent.

In Western countries, the overseas Chinese generally use romanised versions of their Chinese names, and the use of local first names is also common.

=== Discrimination ===
Overseas Chinese have often experienced hostility and discrimination. In countries with small ethnic Chinese minorities, the economic disparity can be remarkable. For example, in 1998, ethnic Chinese made up just 1% of the population of the Philippines and 4% of the population in Indonesia, but have wide influence in the Philippine and Indonesian private economies. The book World on Fire, describing the Chinese as a "market-dominant minority", notes that "Chinese market dominance and intense resentment amongst the indigenous majority is characteristic of virtually every country in Southeast Asia except Thailand and Singapore".

This asymmetrical economic position has incited anti-Chinese sentiment among the poorer majorities. Sometimes the anti-Chinese attitudes turn violent, such as the 13 May Incident in Malaysia in 1969 and the Jakarta riots of May 1998 in Indonesia, in which more than 2,000 people died, mostly rioters burned to death in a shopping mall.

During the Indonesian killings of 1965–66, in which more than 500,000 people died, ethnic Chinese Hakkas were killed and their properties looted and burned as a result of anti-Chinese racism on the excuse that Dipa "Amat" Aidit had brought the PKI closer to China. The anti-Chinese legislation was in the Indonesian constitution until 1998.

The state of the Chinese Cambodians during the Khmer Rouge regime has been described as "the worst disaster ever to befall any ethnic Chinese community in Southeast Asia." At the beginning of the Khmer Rouge regime in 1975, there were 425,000 ethnic Chinese in Cambodia; by the end of 1979 there were just 200,000.

It is commonly held that a major point of friction is the apparent tendency of overseas Chinese to segregate themselves into a subculture. For example, the anti-Chinese Kuala Lumpur racial riots of 13 May 1969 and Jakarta riots of May 1998 were believed to have been motivated by these racially biased perceptions. This analysis has been questioned by some historians, notably Kua Kia Soong, who has put forward the controversial argument that the 13 May incident was a pre-meditated attempt by sections of the ruling Malay elite to incite racial hostility in preparation for a coup. In 2006, rioters damaged shops owned by Chinese-Tongans in Nukuʻalofa. Chinese migrants were evacuated from the riot-torn Solomon Islands.

Ethnic politics can be found to motivate both sides of the debate. In Malaysia, many "Bumiputra" ("native sons") Malays oppose equal or meritocratic treatment towards Chinese and Indians, fearing they would dominate too many aspects of the country. The question of to what extent ethnic Malays, Chinese, or others are "native" to Malaysia is a sensitive political one. It is currently a taboo for Chinese politicians to raise the issue of Bumiputra protections in parliament, as this would be deemed ethnic incitement.

Many of the overseas Chinese emigrants who worked on railways in North America in the 19th century suffered from racial discrimination in Canada and the United States. Although discriminatory laws have been repealed or are no longer enforced today, both countries had at one time introduced statutes that barred Chinese from entering the country, for example the United States Chinese Exclusion Act of 1882 (repealed 1943) or the Canadian Chinese Immigration Act, 1923 (repealed 1947). In both the United States and Canada, further acts were required to fully remove immigration restrictions (namely United States' Immigration and Nationality Acts of 1952 and 1965, in addition to Canada's). Chinese in the United States were also particularly discriminated against during the Cold War.

In Australia, Chinese were targeted by a system of discriminatory laws known as the "White Australia Policy" which was enshrined in the Immigration Restriction Act 1901. The policy was formally abolished in 1973, and in recent years Australians of Chinese background have publicly called for an apology from the Australian Federal Government similar to that given to the 'stolen generations' of indigenous people in 2007 by the then Prime Minister Kevin Rudd.

In September 2004, the Spanish city of Elche experienced an anti-Chinese riot, where around 500 people demonstrated in the city's Carrus industrial zone chanting "Chinese out" and set fire to the warehouse of a Chinese shoe shop and a container causing losses of 800,000 euros (US$984,000). The locals reported that the Chinese caused resentment not because of their numbers (there are far more North African and Latin American immigrants), but because they felt that the Chinese economic practices threatened their age-old social customs, employment norms, and labor relations in Spain.

In South Korea, the relatively low social and economic statuses of ethnic Korean-Chinese have played a role in local hostility towards them. Such hatred had been formed since their early settlement years, where many Chinese–Koreans hailing from rural areas were accused of misbehaviour such as spitting on streets and littering. More recently, they have also been targets of hate speech for their association with violent crime, despite the Korean Justice Ministry recording a lower crime rate for Chinese in the country compared to native South Koreans in 2010.

== Relationship with China ==
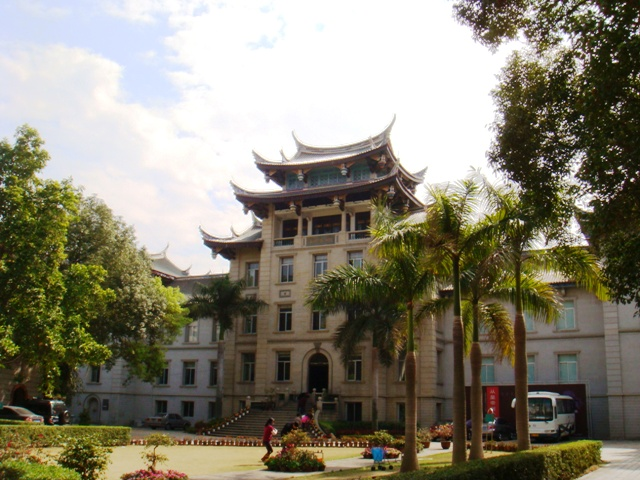
Overseas Chinese Museum, Xiamen, China

Both the People's Republic of China and the Republic of China (known more commonly as Taiwan) maintain high level relationships with the overseas Chinese populations. Both maintain cabinet level ministries to deal with overseas Chinese affairs, and many local governments within the PRC have overseas Chinese bureaus.

Before 2018, the PRC's Overseas Chinese Affairs Office (OCAO) under the State Council was responsible for liaising with overseas Chinese. In 2018, the office was merged into the United Front Work Department of the Central Committee of the Chinese Communist Party.

Throughout its existence but particularly during the general secretaryship of Xi Jinping, the Chinese Communist Party makes patriotic appeals to overseas Chinese to assist the country's political and economic needs. In a July 2022 meeting with the United Front Work Department, Xi encouraged overseas Chinese to support China's rejuvenation and stated that domestic and overseas Chinese should pool their strengths to realize the Chinese Dream. In the PRC's view, overseas Chinese are an asset to demonstrating a positive image of China internationally.

=== Citizenship status ===
The Nationality Law of the People's Republic of China, which does not recognise dual citizenship, provides for automatic loss of PRC citizenship when a former PRC citizen both settles in another country and acquires foreign citizenship. For children born overseas of a PRC citizen, whether the child receives PRC citizenship at birth depends on whether the PRC parent has settled overseas: "Any person born abroad whose parents are both Chinese nationals or one of whose parents is a Chinese national shall have Chinese nationality. But a person whose parents are both Chinese nationals and have both settled abroad, or one of whose parents is a Chinese national and has settled abroad, and who has acquired foreign nationality at birth shall not have Chinese nationality" (Article 5).

By contrast, the Nationality Law of the Republic of China, which both permits and recognises dual citizenship, considers such persons to be citizens of the ROC (if their parents have household registration in Taiwan).

=== Returning and re-emigration ===
In the case of Indonesia and Burma, political strife and ethnic tensions has caused a significant number of people of Chinese origins to re-emigrate back to China. In other Southeast Asian countries with large Chinese communities, such as Malaysia, the economic rise of People's Republic of China has made the PRC an attractive destination for many Malaysian Chinese to re-emigrate. As the Chinese economy opens up, Malaysian Chinese act as a bridge because many Malaysian Chinese are educated in the United States or Britain but can also understand the Chinese language and culture making it easier for potential entrepreneurial and business to be done between the people among the two countries.

Return migration often concentrated in traditional qiaoxiang (侨乡, 'overseas-Chinese hometowns'), in which counties in Guangdong, Fujian, Zhejiang, and Hainan that historically produced large numbers of emigrants. The communities of these provinces developed distinct transnational networks shaped by remittances, circular migration, and hometown associations.

After the Deng Xiaoping reforms, the attitude of the PRC toward the overseas Chinese changed dramatically. Rather than being seen with suspicion, they were seen as people who could aid PRC development via their skills and capital. During the 1980s, the PRC actively attempted to court the support of overseas Chinese by among other things, returning properties that had been confiscated after the 1949 revolution. More recently PRC policy has attempted to maintain the support of recently emigrated Chinese, who consist largely of Chinese students seeking undergraduate and graduate education in the West. Many of the Chinese diaspora are now investing in People's Republic of China providing financial resources, social and cultural networks, contacts and opportunities.

The Chinese government estimates that of the 1,200,000 Chinese people who have gone overseas to study in the thirty years since the reform and opening up beginning in 1978; three-quarters of those who left have not returned to China.

Beijing is attracting overseas-trained academics back home, in an attempt to internationalise its universities. However, some professors educated to the PhD level in the West have reported feeling "marginalised" when they return to China due in large part to the country's "lack of international academic peer review and tenure track mechanisms".

== Language ==
The usage of Chinese by the overseas Chinese has been determined by a large number of factors, including their ancestry, their ancestors' languages, assimilation through generational changes, and official policies of their country of residence. The general trend is that more established Chinese populations in the Western world and in many regions of Asia have Cantonese as either the dominant variety or as a common community vernacular, while Standard Chinese is much more prevalent among new arrivals, making it increasingly common in many Chinatowns.

== Country statistics ==
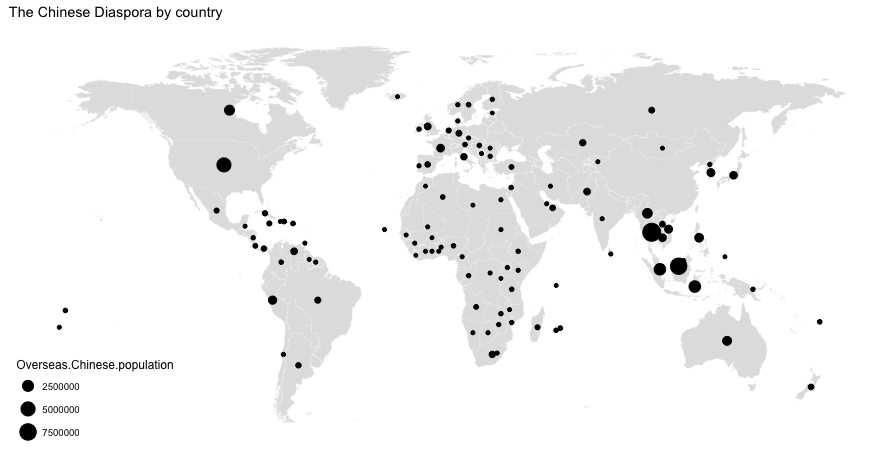
Visualization of overseas Chinese populations by country

Country	Chinese country or region	Number	Percentage of the population of a country or region	Year
Africa				
Algeria	Chinese people in Algeria	10,000		2025
Angola	Chinese people in Angola			2025
Benin	Chinese people in Benin	2,000		2025
Botswana	Chinese people in Botswana	5,000		2025
Burkina Faso	Chinese people in Burkina Faso	500		2025
Burundi	Chinese people in Burundi	300		2025
Cameroon	Chinese people in Cameroon	6,000		2025
Cape Verde	Chinese people in Cape Verde	1,000		2024
Central African Republic	Chinese people in the Central African Republic	400		2025
Chad	Chinese people in Chad	1,600		2025
Comoros	Chinese people in Comoros	300		2025
Democratic Republic of Congo	Chinese people in the DRC	21,000		2021
Djibouti	Chinese people in Djibouti	800		2025
Egypt	Chinese people in Egypt	8,000		2025
Equatorial Guinea	Chinese people in Equatorial Guinea	2,000		2025
Eritrea	Chinese people in Eritrea	400		2025
Ethiopia	Chinese Ethiopians	8,000		2025
Gabon	Chinese people in Gabon	2,100		2025
Gambia	Chinese people in the Gambia	300		2025
Ghana	Sino-Ghanéens	30,000 – 50,000		2025
Guinea	Chinese people in Guinea	20,000		2025
Guinea-Bissau	Chinese people in Guinea-Bissau	900		2025
Ivory Coast	Chinese people in Ivory Coast	4,500		2017
Kenya	Chinese Kenyans	50,000		2025
Lesotho	Chinese people in Lesotho	2,300		2025
Liberia	Chinese people in Liberia	1,500		2025
Libya	Chinese people in Libya	300		2014
Madagascar	Chinese people in Madagascar	50,000		2025
Malawi	Chinese people in Malawi	2,000		2025
Mali	Chinese people in Mali	3,000		2024
Mauritius	Sino-Mauritians	20,000		2025
Morocco	Chinese people in Morocco	2,000		2025
Mozambique	Ethnic Chinese in Mozambique	4,500		2025
Namibia	Chinese people in Namibia	1,900		2025
Niger	Chinese people in Niger	300		2025
Nigeria	Chinese people in Nigeria	100,000		2025
Republic of Congo	Chinese Congolese	4,500		2024
Réunion	Chinois Réunionnais	50,000		2023
Rwanda	Chinese people in Rwanda	3,000		2025
São Tomé and Príncipe	Chinese people in São Tomé and Príncipe	100		2025
Senegal	Chinese Senegalese	5,000		2025
Seychelles	Sino-Seychellois	1,000		2023
Sierra Leone	Chinese people in Sierra Leone	1,500		2024
South Africa	Chinese South Africans	300,000 – 400,000	<1%	2015
South Sudan	Chinese people in South Sudan			2025
Sudan	Chinese people in Sudan	1,500		2023
Tanzania	Chinese Tanzanians	30,000		2025
Togo	Chinese people in Togo	900		2025
Uganda	Chinese Ugandans	20,000		2025
Zambia	Chinese Zambians	13,000		2019
Zimbabwe	Chinese people in Zimbabwe	10,000		2017
Asia/Middle East		29,000,000		
Thailand	Thai Chinese, Peranakan	9,300,000	14%	2015
Malaysia	Malaysian Chinese, Peranakan	7,527,793	23.2%	2020
Indonesia	Chinese Indonesian (Chindo), Peranakan	2,832,510	1.20% (Official)	2010
Singapore	Chinese Singaporean, Peranakan; Chinese nationals in Singapore	2,675,521 (Chinese Singaporeans); 514,110 (Chinese nationals)	76% (Official); No percentage available	2015; 2020
Myanmar	Chinese people in Myanmar, Panthay	1,725,794	3%	2012
Philippines	Chinese Filipino, Tornatras, Sangley	1,146,250–1,400,000	2%	2013
South Korea	Chinese in South Korea	1,070,566	2%	2018
Japan	Chinese in Japan	1,200,000	<1%	2025
Vietnam	Hoa people	749,466	<1%	2019
Cambodia	Chinese Cambodian	343,855	2%	2014
Laos	Laotian Chinese	185,765	1%	2005
United Arab Emirates	Chinese people in the United Arab Emirates	180,000	2%	2009
Saudi Arabia		105,000	<1%	
Pakistan	Chinese people in Pakistan	60,000		2018
Brunei	Ethnic Chinese in Brunei	42,100	10%	2015
Israel	Chinese people in Israel	10,000		2010
North Korea	Chinese in North Korea	10,000		2009
India	Chinese people in India	9,000–85,000 (including Tibetan)		2018
Mongolia	Ethnic Chinese in Mongolia	8,688	<1%	2010
Bangladesh	Chinese people in Bangladesh	98,000		
Qatar		6,000		2014
East Timor	Chinese people in East Timor	4,000–20,000 (historically)		2021
Turkmenistan		3,700		
Sri Lanka	Chinese people in Sri Lanka	3,500	<1%	
Kazakhstan	Chinese in Kazakhstan	3,424 (Excluding Uyghurs and Hui People)		2009
Iran	Chinese people in Iran	3,000 (Excluding Hui People)	<1%	
Kyrgyzstan	Chinese people in Kyrgyzstan	1,813 (Excluing Hui People)		2009
Uzbekistan		1,400		
Nepal		1,344		2001
Europe		1,670,000		
France	Chinese diaspora in France	800,000-1,200,000 (by ancestry) (116,000 Chinese nationals)	1%	2025
United Kingdom	British Chinese	488,847	<1%	2021
Italy	Chinese people in Italy	308,984	<1%	2024
Spain	Chinese people in Spain	223,999	<1%	2022
Germany	Chinese people in Germany	163,000	<1%	2024
Netherlands	Chinese people in the Netherlands	84,453	<1%	2022
Sweden	Chinese people in Sweden	43,203		2025
Portugal	Chinese people in Portugal	27,873	<1%	2023
Switzerland		22,533	<1%	2026
Russia	Chinese people in Russia	19,644	<1%	2021
Ireland	Chinese people in Ireland	19,447	<1%	2016
Hungary		18,851		2018
Austria		17,517	<1%	2024
Turkey	Chinese people in Turkey, Uyghurs in Turkey	15,107–60,000 (including Uyghurs)		2024
Denmark	Chinese people in Denmark	15,103		2020
Belgium	Chinese people in Belgium	14,490	<1%	2024
Norway	Chinese people in Norway	13,350		2020
Finland		17,011		2023
Poland	Chinese people in Poland	8,656		2019
Czech Republic	Chinese people in the Czech Republic	7,485		2018
Romania	Chinese of Romania	5,000		2017
Luxembourg		4,000		2020
Slovakia		2,346		2016
Ukraine		2,213		2001
Greece	Chinese people in Greece	20,000-25,000		2024
Serbia	Chinese people in Serbia	14,500		2023
Cyprus		1,300		
Slovenia		1,285		
Bulgaria	Chinese people in Bulgaria	1,236		2015
Malta		1,090		2017
Iceland		686		2019
Croatia		500		
Albania		200		
Latvia		128		2019
Estonia		104	<1%	2013
Lithuania		97		2021
Americas		8,215,000		
United States	Chinese American, American-born Chinese	5,457,033	1–2%	2023
Canada	Chinese Canadian, Canadian-born Chinese	1,715,770	4–5%	2021
Brazil	Chinese Brazilian	250,000		2017
Argentina	Chinese people in Argentina	120,000–200,000	<1%	2016
Panama	Chinese people in Panama	80,000	2%	2018
Mexico	Chinese immigration to Mexico	24,489	<1%	2019
Peru	Chinese-Peruvian	14,223 1,000,000–3,000,000	3–10%	2015
Chile	Chinese people in Chile	17,021	<1%	2017
Venezuela	Chinese Venezuelans	15,358		2011
Dominican Republic	Ethnic Chinese in the Dominican Republic	15,000		2017
Nicaragua	Chinese people in Nicaragua	15,000		
French Guiana	Chinese people in French Guiana	10,000		
Costa Rica	Chinese people in Costa Rica	9,170		2011
Suriname	Chinese-Surinamese	7,885	1–2%	2012
Jamaica	Chinese Jamaicans	50,228		2011
Trinidad & Tobago	Chinese Trinidadian and Tobagonian	3,984		2011
Guyana	Chinese Guyanese	2,377		2012
Colombia		2,176		2017
Belize	Ethnic Chinese in Belize	1,716	<1%	2000
Cuba	Chinese Cuban	1,300		2008
Bahamas		800		
Haiti	Chinese Haitians	230		2010
Barbados		100		
Saint Lucia		100		
Oceania		1,500,000		
Australia	Chinese Australian	1,390,639	6%	2021
New Zealand	Chinese New Zealander	279,039	5%	2023
Papua New Guinea	Chinese people in Papua New Guinea	20,000		2008
Fiji	Chinese in Fiji	8,000		2012
Tonga	Chinese in Tonga	3,000		2001
Palau	Chinese in Palau	1,030		2012
Samoa	Chinese in Samoa	620		2015
Micronesia		500		
Nauru	Chinese in Nauru	151	1–2%	2011
Marshall Islands		100		

== See also ==
- Chinese folk religion and Chinese folk religion in Southeast Asia
- Chinatown, the article and Category:Chinatowns the international category list
- Chinese kin, Kongsi and Ancestral shrine
- Chinese Consolidated Benevolent Association
- Overseas Chinese Affairs Office
- Chin Haw
- List of overseas Chinese
- List of politicians of Chinese descent
- Migration in China
- Kapitan Cina
- Qingtianese diaspora
- Overseas Chinese banks

== Bibliography ==
- Ananta, Aris; Arifin, Evi Nurvidya; Hasbullah, M Sairi; Handayani, Nur Budi; Pramono, Agus (2015). Demography of Indonesia's Ethnicity. Institute of Southeast Asian Studies. ISBN 978-981-4519-87-8.
