= Chinese people in Ethiopia =

- (China) (Ethiopia)

Total population
- 80,000-120,000 (2014-2016)

Regions with significant populations
- Addis Ababa, Hawassa, Dire Dawa, Harar, Jijiga and Mekelle

Languages
- Mandarin, Amharic, English, other Languages of Ethiopia.

Religion
- Irreligion, Buddhism.

Related ethnic groups
- Overseas Chinese

The number of Chinese residents in Ethiopia has risen considerably since the turn of the millennium.

== Integration and community ==
Figures provided by different sources from the Chinese embassy in Addis Ababa show a wide variance in population estimates. According to an article in the academic journal World Development, a Chinese diplomat in Ethiopia interviewed in December 2014 stated there were 20,000 Chinese while in contrast the Chinese ambassador in Addis Ababa stated there were 60,000 Chinese in a January 2016 public interview. The community is largely involved in commerce with some working in telecom or railway construction and others owning businesses. The Chinese ambassador La Yifan credited the Chinese community with creating one million local jobs.

Also in 2007, the first 300 volunteers selected from among 10,000 applicants to a new Chinese government programme arrived in Ethiopia, Seychelles, and Zimbabwe. They would perform a variety of work including teaching Chinese, introducing hospital staff to traditional Chinese medicine, and aiding in poultry farming.

Like in many African countries, the Chinese are seen as keeping to themselves. In 2007, another New York Times report by Howard French on Chinese in Ethiopia noted the "clannish" social interaction of Chinese by citing a communal compound of 200 Chinese workers for Road and Bridge Construction (a Chinese construction company) who ate Chinese food, got health care from a Chinese doctor, and did not interact with outsiders.

== Abole raid ==
A landmark incident in Chinese perceptions of Ethiopia was the 2007 Abole oil field raid in which 74 workers including 9 from China were killed. The rebels in the attack claimed that the target was the Ethiopian military and the Chinese were killed in explosions during the fighting. Howard French of The New York Times called the incident part of the learning curve for Chinese in understanding the risks of interaction in Africa but not a setback that would deter the Chinese from realizing that Africa would be "the stage where China's image as a global actor of the first rank will be forged."

== Organisations ==
The Chinese Chamber of Commerce in Ethiopia (埃塞俄比亚中国商会) was established in April 2008 in Addis Ababa.

== See also ==
- Africa-China relations
