= Luo Niansheng =

Chinese translator

- 罗念生
- Born: Luo Maode (罗懋德); July 12, 1904; Weiyuan County, Sichuan, Qing China
- Died: April 10, 1990 (aged 85); Beijing, China
- Education: Tsinghua University; Ohio State University; Columbia University; Cornell University
- Occupation: Translator
- Spouse: Ma Wanyi
- Children: 2
- Writing career
- Language: Chinese, English, Classical Greek and Latin
- Period: 1934–1990
- Notable work: Aesop's Fables
- Notable awards: Royal Swedish Academy of Sciences – The Highest Prize for Literature and Art (1987)

Luo Niansheng (simplified Chinese: 罗念生; traditional Chinese: 羅念生; pinyin: Luó Niànshēng; 12 July 1904 – 10 April 1990) was a Chinese translator. He was known for translating Ancient Greek literature into Chinese.

== Biography ==
Luo was born in Weiyuan County, Sichuan in July 1904.

He entered Tsinghua University in 1922. After graduation, Luo studied in Ohio State University, Columbia University and Cornell University. Luo returned to China in 1934, and he worked as a professor in Peking University, Sichuan University, and Tsinghua University. Later, Luo was transferred to Chinese Academy of Social Science to work as a researcher.

Luo died of cancer in Beijing in 1990, at the age of 86.

== Works ==
=== Translations ===
- Works of Aeschylus (埃斯库罗斯悲剧七种)
- Works of Sophocles (索福克勒斯悲剧七种)
- Works of Euripides (欧力比德斯悲剧五种)
- Works of Aristophanes (阿里斯多芬喜剧五种)
- Aristotle's Rhetoric (亚里士多德修辞学)
- Aristotle's Poetics (亚里士多德诗学)
- Aesop's Fables (伊索寓言)
- Parallel Lives (普鲁塔克名人传)

== Awards and Honour ==
- Royal Swedish Academy of Sciences - The Highest Prize for Literature and Art (December 1987)

== Personal life ==
Luo married Ma Wanyi (马宛颐). The couple had two sons, Luo Jinlin (罗锦麟) and Luo Jinwen (罗锦文).
