= Chinese people in Kazakhstan =

Chinese people in Kazakhstan Chinese Kazakhstanis
Total population
- 6,500

Regions with significant populations
- Almaty

Related ethnic groups
- Overseas Chinese

The number of Chinese people in Kazakhstan has varied through the centuries. There have been various migrations of ethnic minorities from China to Kazakhstan in the 19th and early 20th centuries, such as that of the Dungan people (Hui) fleeing Qing Dynasty forces after a failed 1862–1877 rebellion in Northwest China or the Uyghur and Kazakh exodus from Xinjiang during the 1950s Great Leap Forward; however, their descendants do not consider themselves to be "Chinese people". The modern wave of migration from China only dates back to the early 1990s.

As a result of centuries-old migrations from China, distinct ethnic diasporas emerged in Kazakhstan: Uyghurs – 276,449 people (2015), Dungans (Hui) – 98,577 people (2019) and Han Chinese – 189,762 people (2021). The Han Chinese is a highly urbanized ethnic group: 97% live in the cities, predominantly in Almaty, Astana and Karaganda and is well educated: 87.2% of Han have higher (university) and vocational education.

== Migration history ==
During the Mongol Empire, Han Chinese were moved to Central Asian areas like Besh Baliq, Almaliq and Samarqand by the Mongols where they worked as artisans and farmers. The Daoist Chinese master Qiu Chuji travelled through Kazakhstan to meet Genghis Khan in Afghanistan.

China and Kazakhstan agreed on visa-free travel in early 1992, which led to 250 to 300 Chinese citizens entering Kazakhstan each day and not returning to China. Most are believed to have simply used Kazakhstan as a transit point to Europe. Visa-free travel was terminated in 1993. The border between the two countries remained strictly controlled and highly militarised until the 1995 China–Kazakhstan Joint Declaration, following which People's Liberation Army units in the region were redeployed to the borders with Tajikistan and Afghanistan in southern Xinjiang. Starting from them, many Chinese traders began flowing into Kazakhstan. When the Kazakhstani government first opened a consulate in Ürümqi in 1997, it did not even issue visas to local people, but by 2004 it was possible for Chinese people to obtain business visas with an invitation from an organisation in Kazakhstan.

Some Kazakhstan popular media reports claimed there were as many as 300,000 Chinese people in Kazakhstan by the year 2000. An article from China's official Xinhua News Agency repeated this same number in 2009. However, official entrance statistics by the National Security Committee of Kazakhstan showed only 46,000 in 2000, 91,500 in 2005, 134,900 in 2010 and 239,600 visitors from China in Kazakhstan in 2014. Among visitors are citizens of various ethnicities: Han, Kazakhs, Uighurs, Dungans (Hui), Uzbeks, Koreans and others. They arrive with various purposes: official and business visits, private, tourism, labour, transit.

== Business and employment ==
The recruitment of the working force from China, largely entering the country as employees of Chinese companies, dates back to 1993. 559 workers from China entered the country according to governmentally approved quota for attracting the foreign labour force. This grew to 1,457 by 2004, 5,008 by 2006 and 10,104 by 2010, making up 22% of the total foreign labour. Initially, most were concentrated in Almaty, but more are spreading out to southern and western Kazakhstan as well. They are commonly employed in energy and construction companies. Some Chinese who have officially entered the country on short-term business visas for the purpose of trade are also in reality employed as labourers by Chinese companies.

In the 2000s, independent entrepreneurs running import-export businesses, as well as larger investors, began to become more active. Most of the products which Chinese traders sell are purchased in the special economic zones in the Xinjiang border regions. Over 4,000 Chinese firms or Kazakhstani firms with some Chinese investors are officially registered with the government; however, as of 2006, only 213 were active.

There is a Chinese bazaar in Almaty, the Barakholka Bazaar, which in addition to selling general Chinese-made products such as electronics or foodstuffs to local people, also sells products aimed at Chinese people such as Chinese pop music or Chinese-language newspapers. These are not in evidence in other urban areas. It came to be dominated by Uyghur and Dungan traders in the 1990s; it is actually located near the site of a former Dungan kolkhoz and the areas of traditional Uyghur settlement in Almaty – Zarya Vostoka village.

The Dungan have often played an intermediary role in business ventures between migrants from China and local people.

== Media ==
A Xinjiang-based free newspaper aimed at Chinese people in Kazakhstan, the Hāsàkèsītǎn Huáqiáo Bào (哈萨克斯坦华侨报, literally "Kazakhstan Chinese Emigrant Newspaper"), received permission from the Kazakhstan government in April 2009 to begin publication.

The editors plan to publish it bilingually in both Russian and Chinese, with two issues of eight pages each per month. It is printed by the same department responsible for the Xinjiang Economic Daily.

== Ethnic Kazakhs among the migrants ==
The Kazakh government has sought to promote permanent relocation of ethnic Kazakhs from abroad in Kazakhstan by providing them with financial assistance and land grants in border areas. However, this eventually requires them to give up their Chinese nationality and right of residence; according to Xinjiang media, many later come to regret this move.

Kazakhs repatriating from China have expressed that they experience difficulty integrating because they are more familiar with the Arabic orthography for the Kazakh language as used in China, rather than the Cyrillic one used in Kazakhstan. Further, they often speak only Chinese, and very rarely any Russian, as a second language. Kazakh repatriates from China tend to find jobs at Chinese companies or joint ventures.

According to the official data, in 1995–2014, Kazakhstan citizenship was granted in total to 73,800 individuals from China, of who 73,713 were Kazakh repatriates; 13 – Han Chinese, and 73 – other ethnicities (as of January 1, 2015).

Since 1991 and until October 1, 2019, 1,057,000 ethnic Kazakh repatriates arrived to Kazakhstan. The number of oralmans from China was 13.2%, or around 139,600 people. Most are concentrated around Almaty and East Kazakhstan Province. They form the majority of teachers of the Chinese language at Kazakhstani universities.

== Inter-ethnic relations ==
Kazakhstanis generally express neutral attitudes towards Chinese migrants (55% of respondents in 2007). In 2012 this share with indifferent attitudes shrunk up to 44%, and the share of those with "poor" attitudes increased from 15 to 33%; respondents with positive attitudes accounted for 23% (26% in 2007).

There is even some opposition to the presence or further migration of Uyghurs or Kazakhs from Xinjiang, because of the perception that their presence may draw more Chinese influence into the country as well. A 2009 proposal by the Chinese government to lease one million hectares of steppe for cultivation of soybeans sparked a series of protests in Almaty in December and January over the possibility that Chinese labourers would be brought to the country to work the land.

According to the 2012 sociological survey, higher tolerance to Chinese migrants is observed among ethnic minorities and Russians, those aged 18–29 and 30–39, and respondents with higher educational levels.

There is a popular perception that a large and rapidly growing number of Chinese people marry Kazakhstani citizens to obtain permanent residency in the country, but in fact, there were only 74 such marriages between 1991 and 2007.

== See also ==
- China–Kazakhstan relations
- Chinese diaspora
- Ethnic groups in Kazakhstan
- Kazakhs in China
