= DK-10 =

- Type: Medium range surface-to-air missile
- Place of origin: China

Service history
- In service: 2017 – present
- Used by: Royal Moroccan Army; Rwanda Defence Force

Production history
- Manufacturer: Aviation Industry Corporation of China (AVIC); China North Industries Corporation

Specifications
- Mass: 372 kg
- Diameter: 203 / 260 mm
- Wingspan: 497 mm
- Warhead: 20 kg HE warhead
- Detonation mechanism: impact / proximity
- Engine: rocket motor
- Propellant: solid fuel
- Operational range: 3 km to 50 km
- Flight altitude: 30 m to 20 km
- Guidance system: inertial navigation system / datalink / ARH
- Launch platform: Surface

The DK-10 missile (Chinese: 地空-10) is a surface-to-air missile (SAM) developed by Aviation Industry Corporation of China (AVIC), as part of the Sky Dragon 50, Tianlong-50 (Chinese: 天龙50), or GAS2, air defense system, jointly developed by AVIC and China North Industries Corporation (Norinco). As a competitor to the HQ-16 (LY-80) medium-range air defense system, it lost the bid against the HQ-16 for the Chinese People's Liberation Army service as the HQ-16 was selected. Later, it was exported by Norinco for foreign armed forces.

== History and development ==
The DK-10 missile is a surface-to-air variant developed from the PL-12 (SD-10) air-to-air missile. The PL-12 (SD-10) was developed by Aviation Industry Corporation of China (AVIC) as a beyond-visual-range active-radar weapon for the Chengdu J-10 and Chengdu FC-1 fighters. At Zhuhai Airshow 2008, AVIC revealed the Hunter II (Chinese: 猎手-2) air defense missile system, which consists of a mix of ground-launched PL-12 (SD-10) and PL-9C missiles. The Hunter II system can engage targets at a range of 15–21,000 m (49–68,898 ft).

SD-10, as a ground launch missile, had its limitations; thus, AVIC developed an improved variant called DK-10, which is optimized for ground launch with an enlarged missile fuselage containing more fuel. In September 2014, the DK-10 missile was displayed at the AAD Defense Exhibition in South Africa. At Zhuhai Airshow in November 2014, The DK-10 missile was displayed as a part of the Sky Dragon 50 air defense system, jointly developed in partnership by AVIC and China North Industries Corporation (Norinco). Aside from the DK-10, a shorter-range version called the Sky Dragon 12 was also displayed.

== Design ==
DK-10 is an enlarged SD-10A for better ground-launched performance. The missile features a length of 5.054 m (16.58 ft), a diameter of 203 mm (8.0 in), a range of 50 km (31 mi), and a launch altitude of 30–19,800 m (98–64,961 ft). The guidance mode consists of an inertial navigation system, datalink, and active radar homing (ARH) at the terminal phase.

The Sky Dragon 50 air defense system can fire multiple DK-10 missiles simultaneously. A typical battery consists of one command vehicle, one IBIS-150 3D radar vehicle, one fire distribution vehicle, and up to six launch vehicles. Each launch vehicle consists of a 6x6 Beiben 2628 truck carrying 4 ready-to-launch missile canisters. The IBIS-150 radar can simultaneously track 144 targets and engage 12 targets by guiding a total of 24 missiles, with two missiles against each target to ensure that the minimum probability of kill is greater than eighty percent. The radar has a search range of 150 km (93 mi) and a tracking range of 100 km (62 mi) for a typical fighter-sized target. Aside from the IBIS-150 radar, the customer can choose the more advanced IBIS-200 active electronically scanned array (AESA) radar.

== Deployment ==
The Sky Dragon 50 system was a competitor to the HQ-16 (LY-80). However, it was not selected and adopted by the People's Liberation Army.

In 2014, it was reported that the Rwandan Armed Forces had purchased at least 4 launchers of the Sky Dragon 50.

In 2017, the Sky Dragon 50 was sold to the Moroccan Armed Forces. Prior to taking delivery, Moroccan officers from the Royal Artillery, radar specialist, and air defense operator units had undergone training in China.

== Variants ==
DK-10
Surface to air missile developed from the SD-10A missile
Sky Dragon 50
Surface-to-air missile system mounted on Beiben 2628 truck

== Operators ==
=== Current operators ===
Morocco

- Royal Moroccan Army - 24 launchers

Rwanda

- Rwanda Defence Force - 4 launchers

== See also ==
- List of surface-to-air missiles
