= Chapel of the Augustine Sisters of Saint Mary =

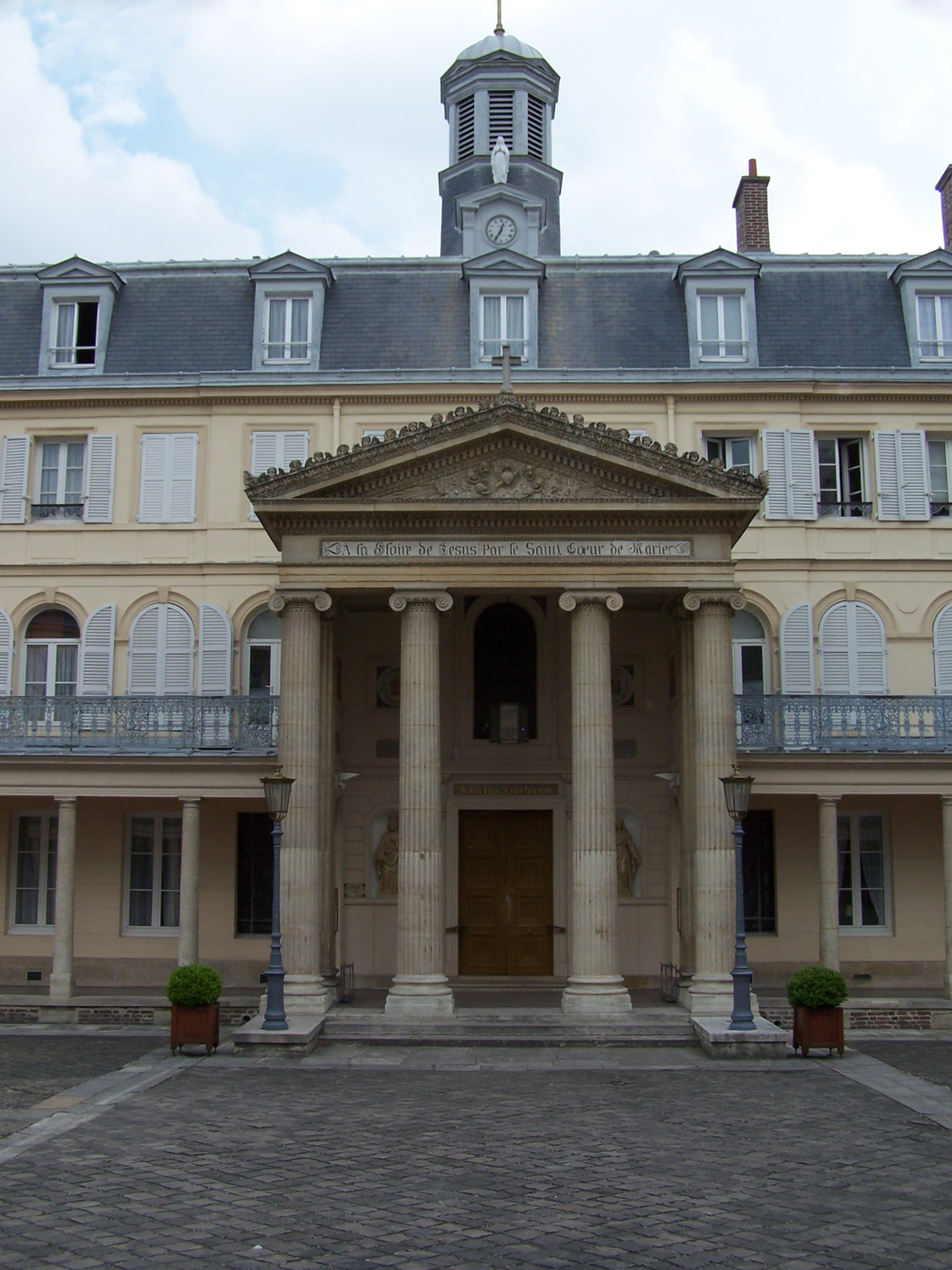
Chapel of the Augustine Sisters of Saint Mary

The Chapel of the Augustine Sisters of Saint Mary (French: Chapelle de la Congrégation des Augustines du Saint Cœur de Marie) is the chapel of the sisters of the convent of the Sacred Heart of Mary, located at 29 rue de la Sante, in the 13th arrondissement of Paris. The building, in the neo-classical style,is considered a particularly good example of the religious architecture built in Paris during the July Monarchy of King Louis Philippe I.

The Congregation of the Augustines of the Sacred Heart of Mary was founded in Paris in 1827, and was dedicated to creating a clinic for the poor and homeless. In 1836, the congregation acquired the residence of the Count of Chalabre, and commissioned the architect Antoine-Casimir Chaland to transform it into a chapel and home for their clinic, which opened in 1840. The order maintained the clinic until 1984, when the sisters of the dedicated the building entirely to the chapel and the residences of the sisters, following the doctrine of their order.

The chapel is open to the public during the daily worship services at 11:00 a.m..

== Art and Decoration ==
The art and decoration of the chapel choir features paintings by Paulina Caspers (1865-1946) depicting the mysteries of the Virgin Mary, including the Annunciation, the Visitation, the Nativity, the Resurrection, the ascension to heaven, and the Assumption of Mary and Coronation of Mary in Heaven

The capitals of the columns and ceiling vaults have an abundance of decoration in the Renaissance style, including arabesques and monograms of Mary and of Saint Augustine. The stained glass windows, by an unknown artist, are devoted to symbols of the Sacred Heart.

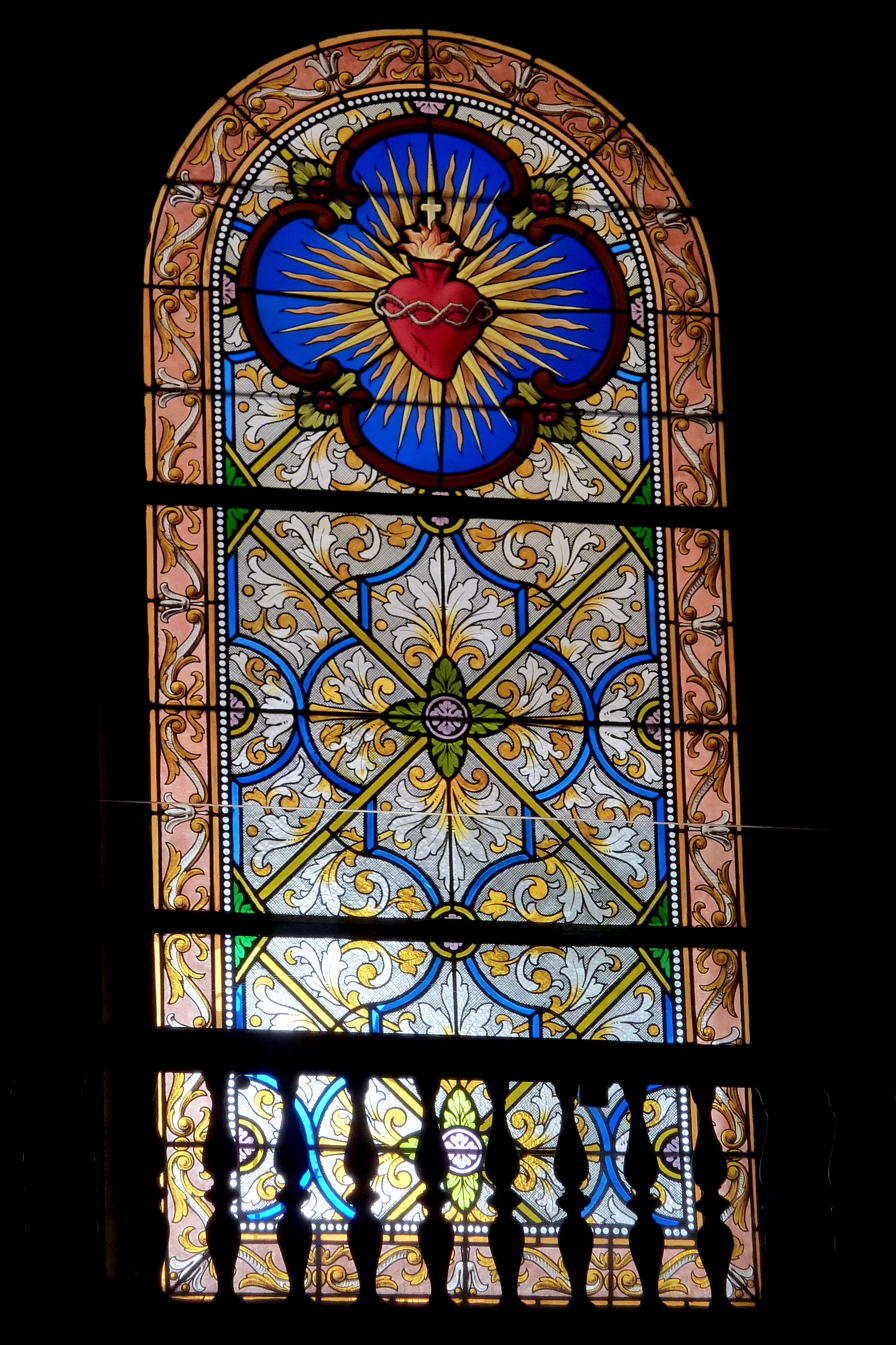
Window depicting the Sacred Heart

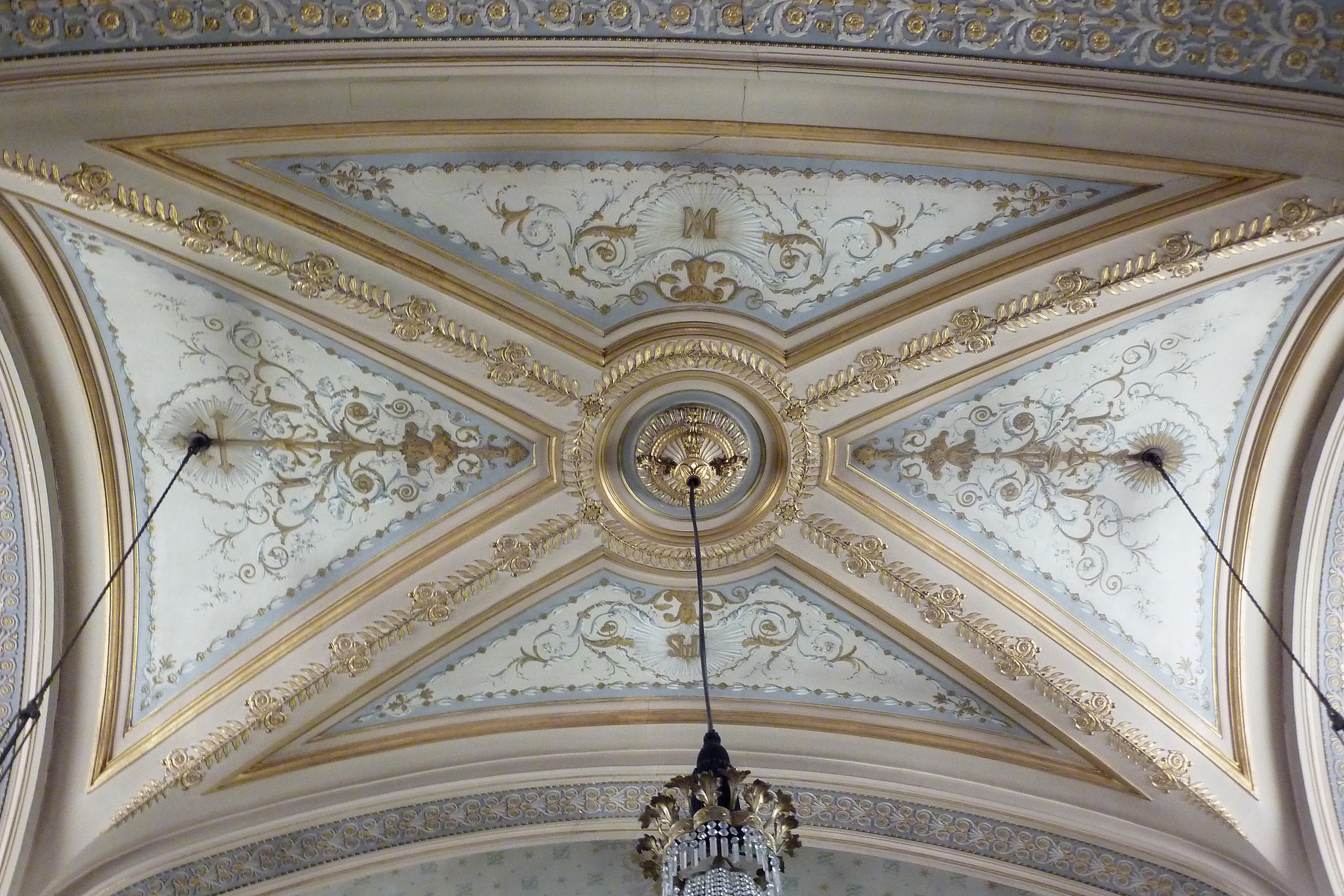
Chapel ceiling, showing Sacred Heart of Christ

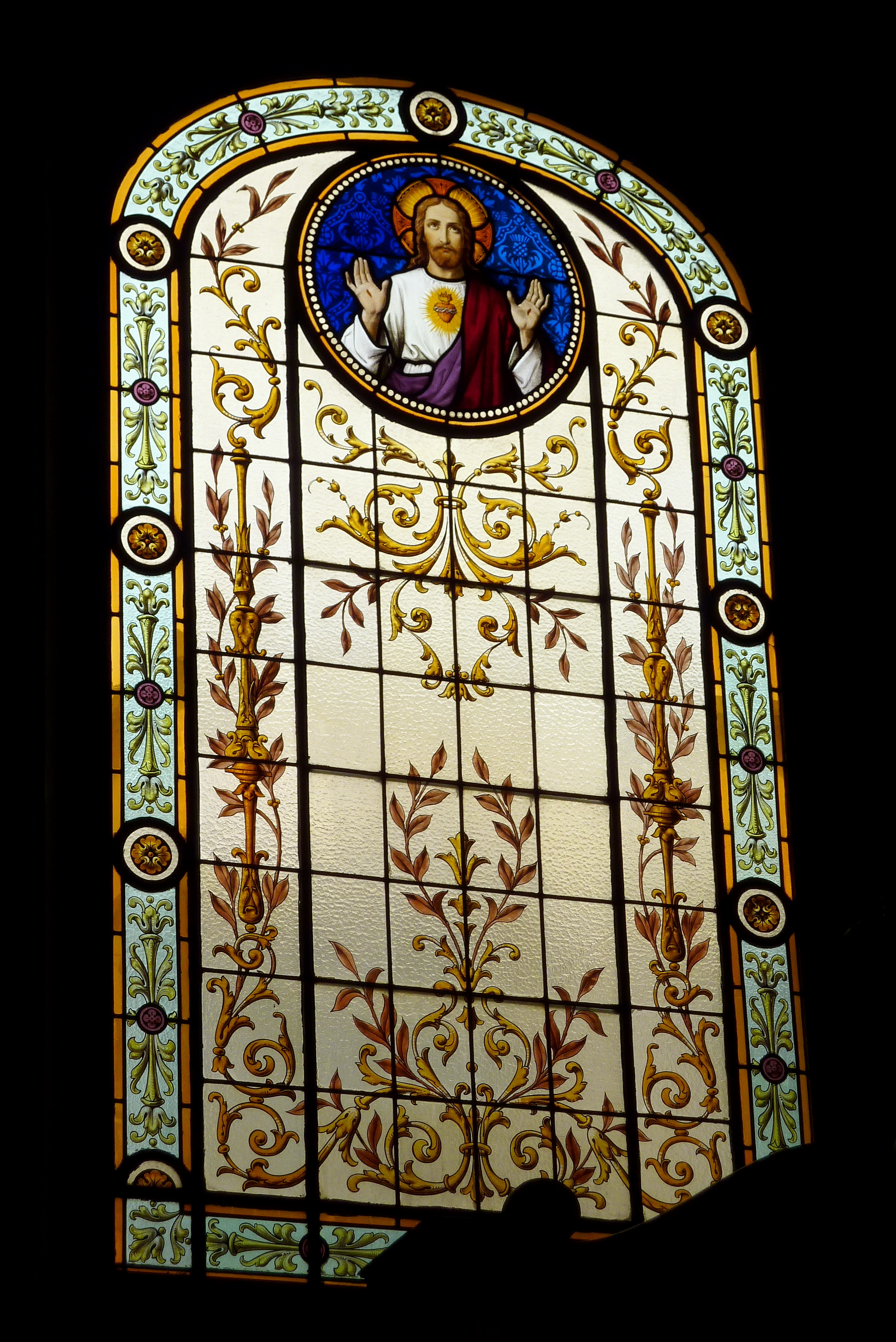
Stained Glass in nave

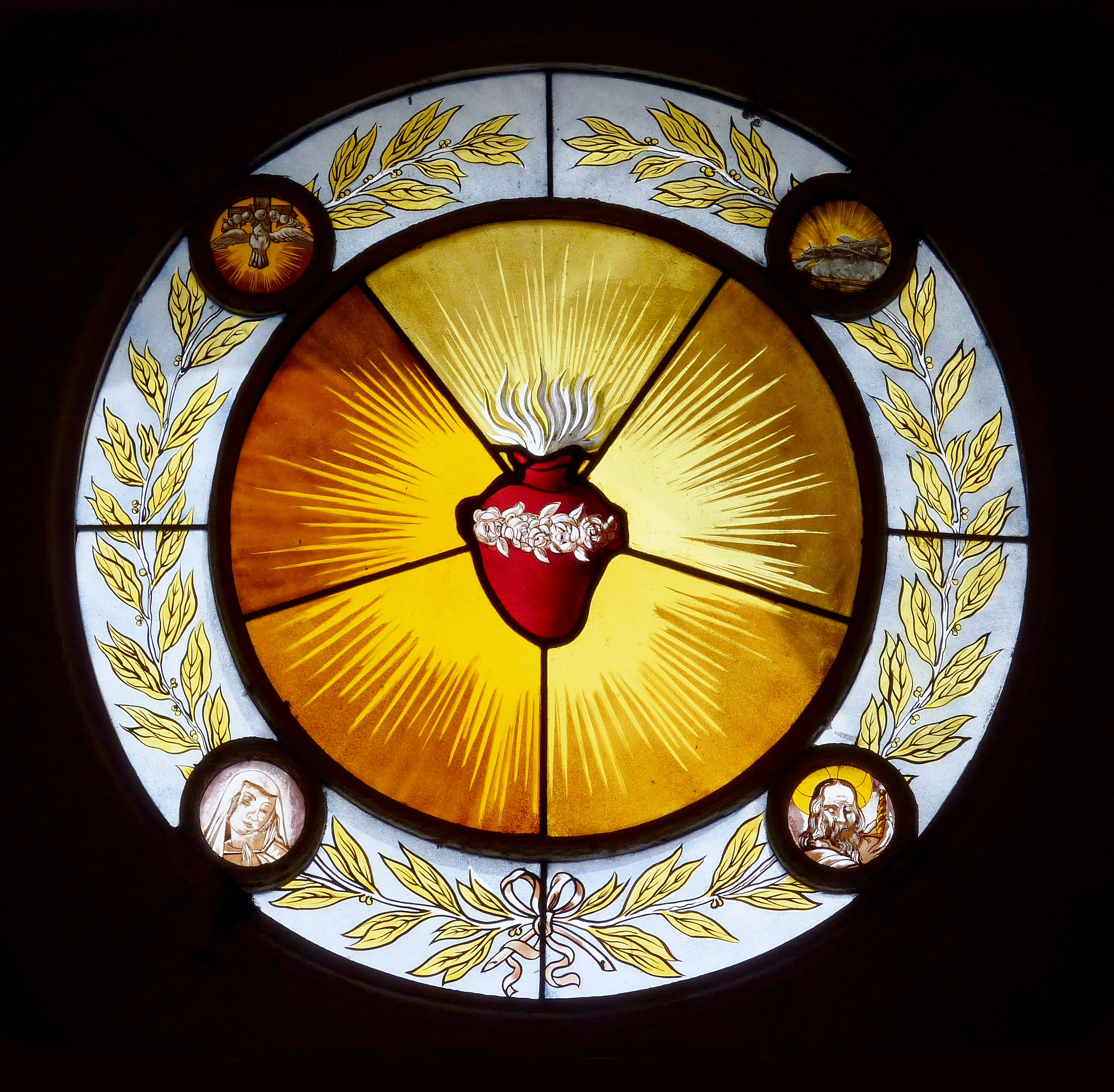
Window of the Sacred Heart

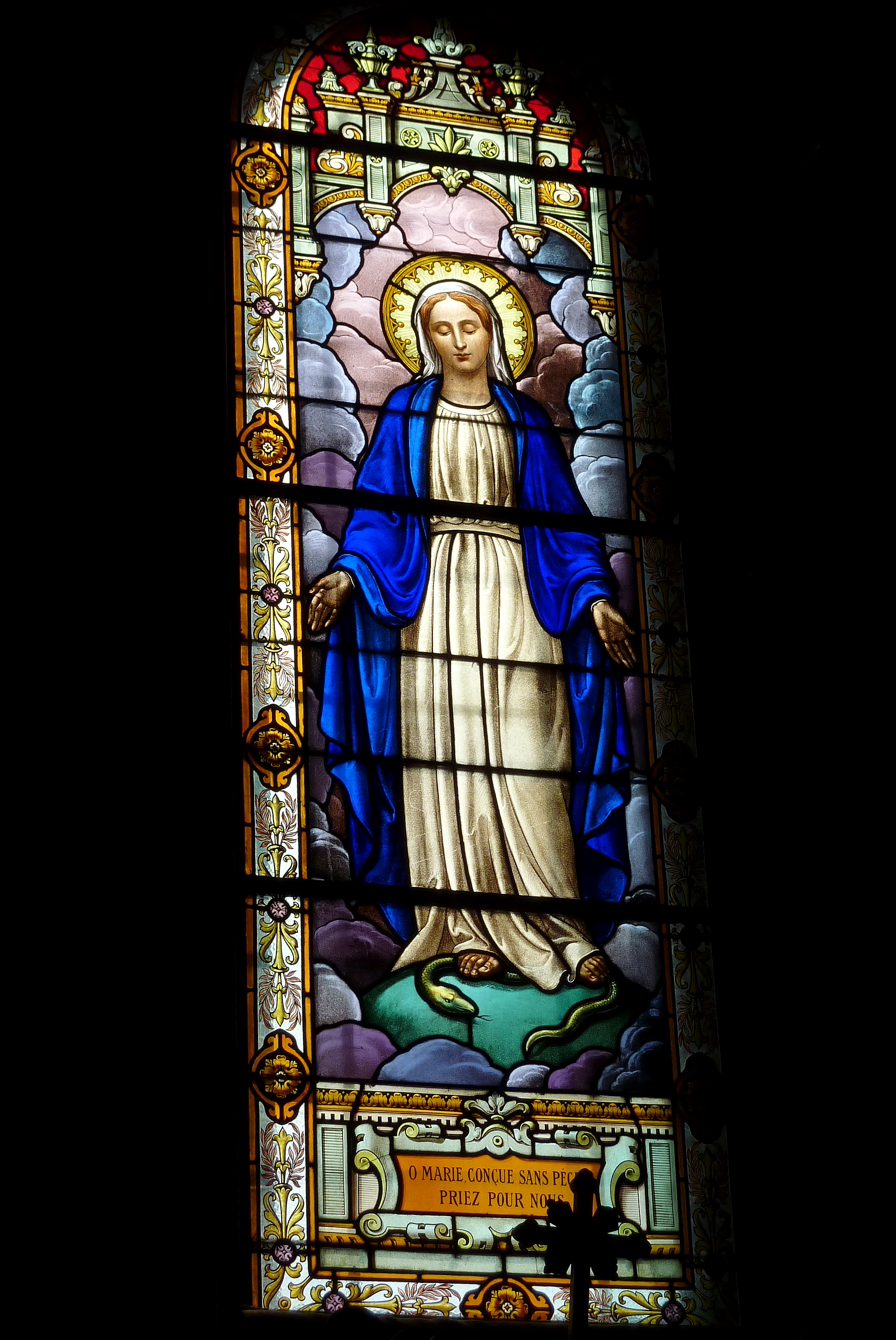
Stained glass depicting the Virgin Mary in nave

== Sources (in French) ==
- Bernard, P. Les œuvres religieuses du XIXe siècle. Vie de la R. Mère Sainte Angèle. Paris, 1917.
- Langlois, G.-A. Les Augustines. In 13e Arrondissement, Une ville dans Paris. Paris : DAAVP, 1993, p. 57-58.
- Brunel, Georges. Dictionnaire des églises de Paris : catholique, orthodoxe, protestant. Paris : Hervas, 1995.
- Chapelle des Soeurs Augustins du Sacre-Coeur de Marie (https://beauxartsparis.fr/fr/privatisations/chapelle-des-petits-augustins)

Media related to Chapelle des Augustines du Saint-Cœur de Marie at Wikimedia Commons
