= Saint-Hippolyte, Paris =

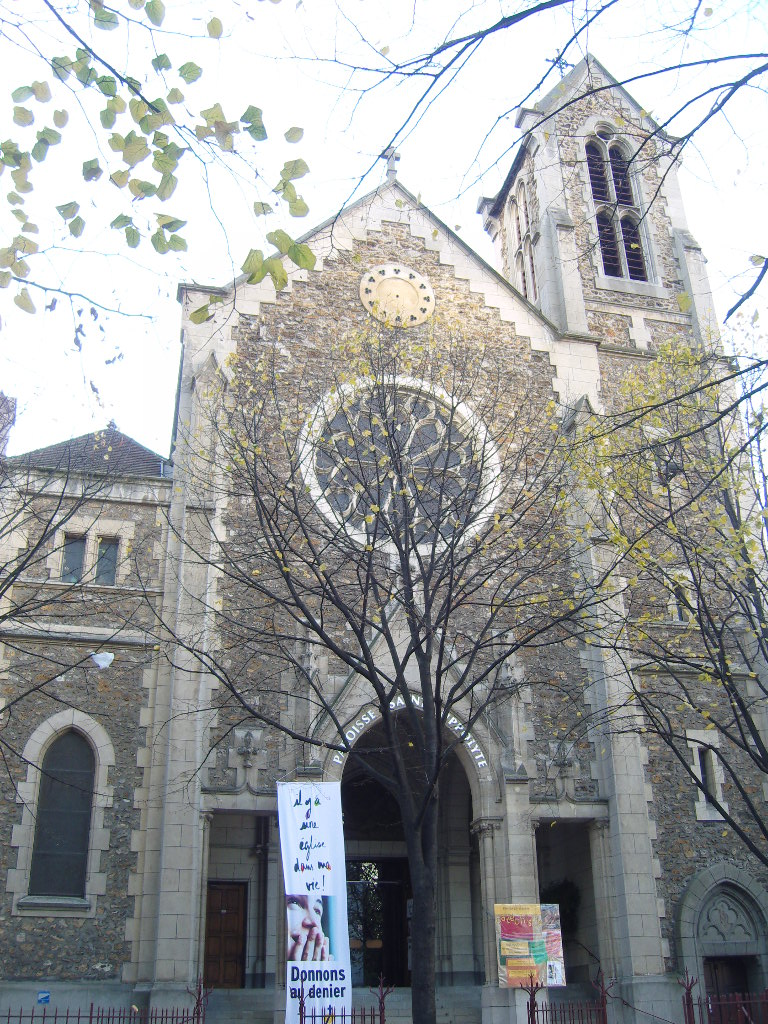
- Saint-Hippolyte, Paris
- 48°49′17″N 2°21′47″E
- Address: Avenue de Choisy, 13th arrondissement of Paris
- Country: France
- Denomination: Roman Catholic

Architecture
- Style: Neo-Gothic
- Groundbreaking: 1909
- Completed: 1924

Administration
- Archdiocese: Paris

Église Saint-Hippolyte is a Roman-Catholic church located on the Avenue de Choisy in the 13th arrondissement of Paris. It was constructed in the Neɒ-Gothic style between 1909 and 1924 by the architect Jules-Godefroy Astruc. It is notable for its colourful decoration and stained glass windows from the period.

== History ==
=== First Church of Saint-Hippolyte ===
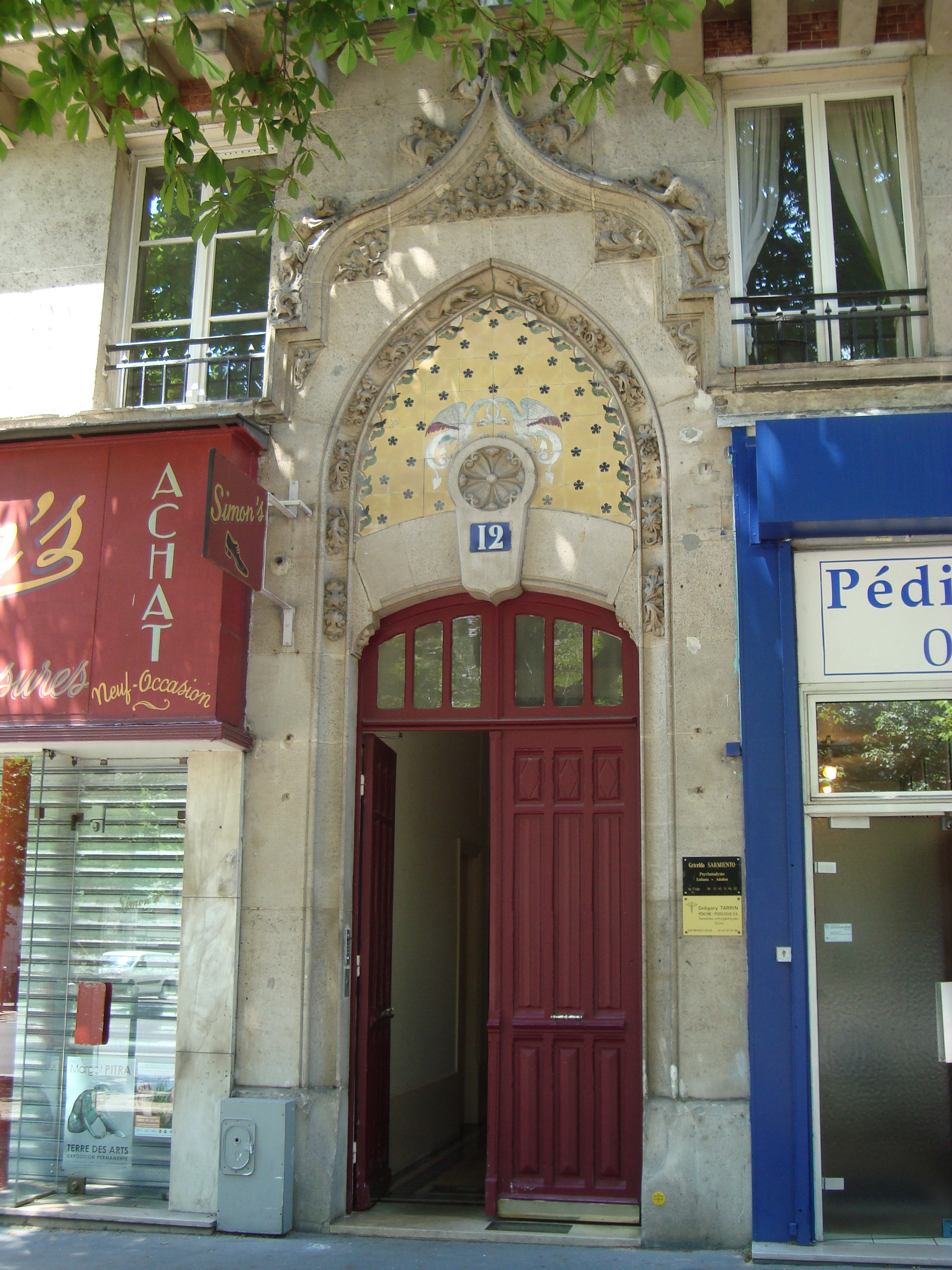
Doorway of the first church at Rue Arago today

An earlier church named for Hippolytus of Rome had been built in 1158 in the northern part of the same arrondissement, at what is now number 12 Rue Arago in the Quartier de Croulebarbe. The first church had been part of the Collegiate of Saint Marcel, and then at the beginning of the 13th century had become a parish church. It was largely rebuilt in the 16th century, with an altar designed by Charles LeBrun. In 1793, during the French Revolution, it was sold as a national property, looted, and was finally destroyed during the renovation of central Paris carried out by Napoleon III. The only surviving portion is a Gothic doorway now visible at 12 boulevard Saint-Hippolyte

=== New church ===
The principal sponsor of the present church, and donor of the site, was Hippolyte Panhard, a pioneer Paris automobile manufacturer named for Saint Hippolytus.

The church was constructed beginning in 1909. and originally was small, with a choir and four traverses. As the neighborhood grew rapidly, it was enlarged in 2024 with the addition of three new traverses, closed by a facade, and two side aisles. The neighbourhood has changed considerably since the church was built, and it is now largely surrounded by Chinatown.

== Art and decoration ==
=== Exterior ===
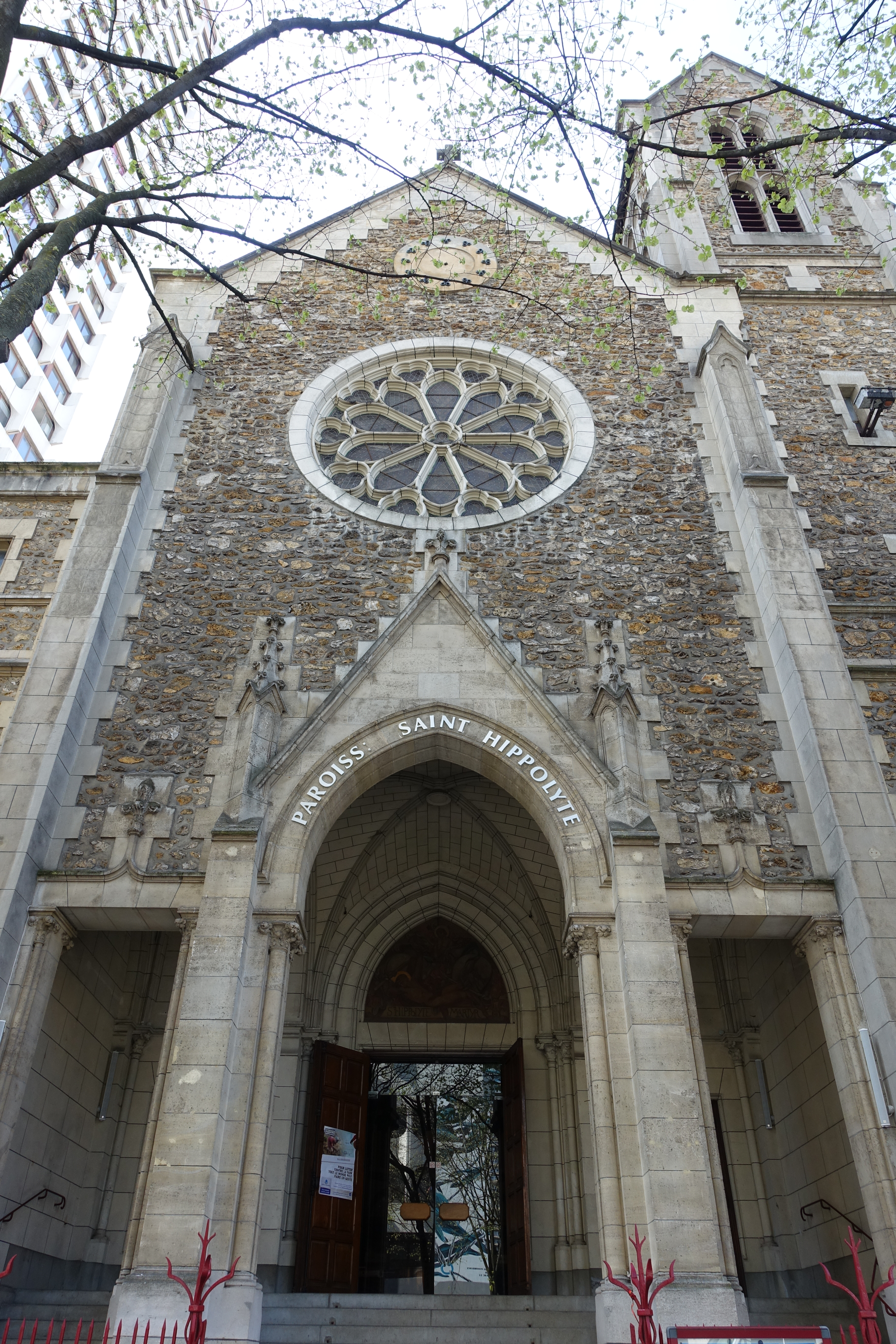
The facade and portal

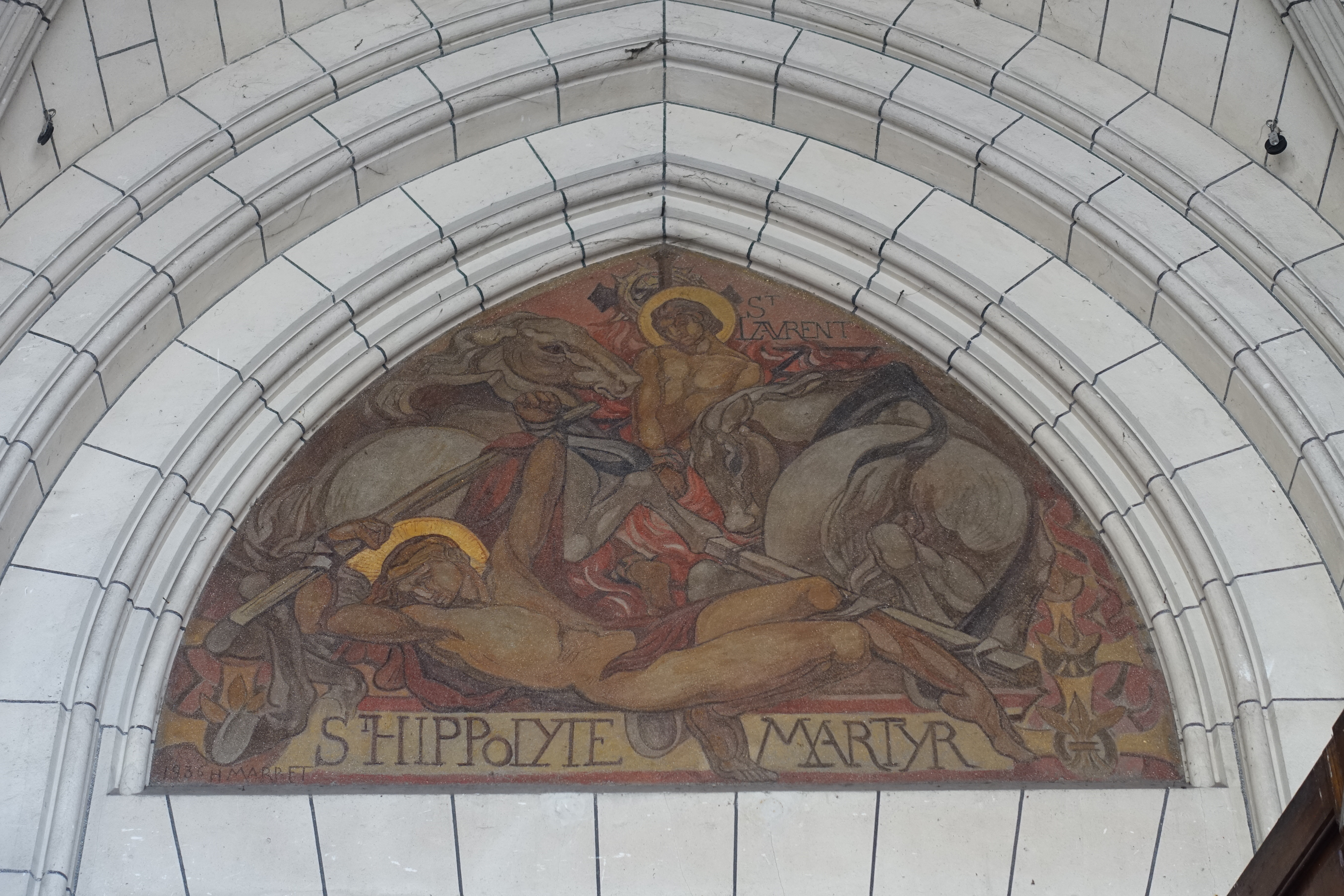
Painting over the portal, depicting the martyrdom of Saint Hippolyte

=== Interior ===
The church has single nave with two outer aisles, with no lateral chapels. The interior style is [Neo-Gothic], with arcades, columns with sculpted vegetation on the capitals; Gothic pointed arches; and a ceiling traversed by [rib vaults]. The Chapel of the Virgin is located in the apse behind the choir.

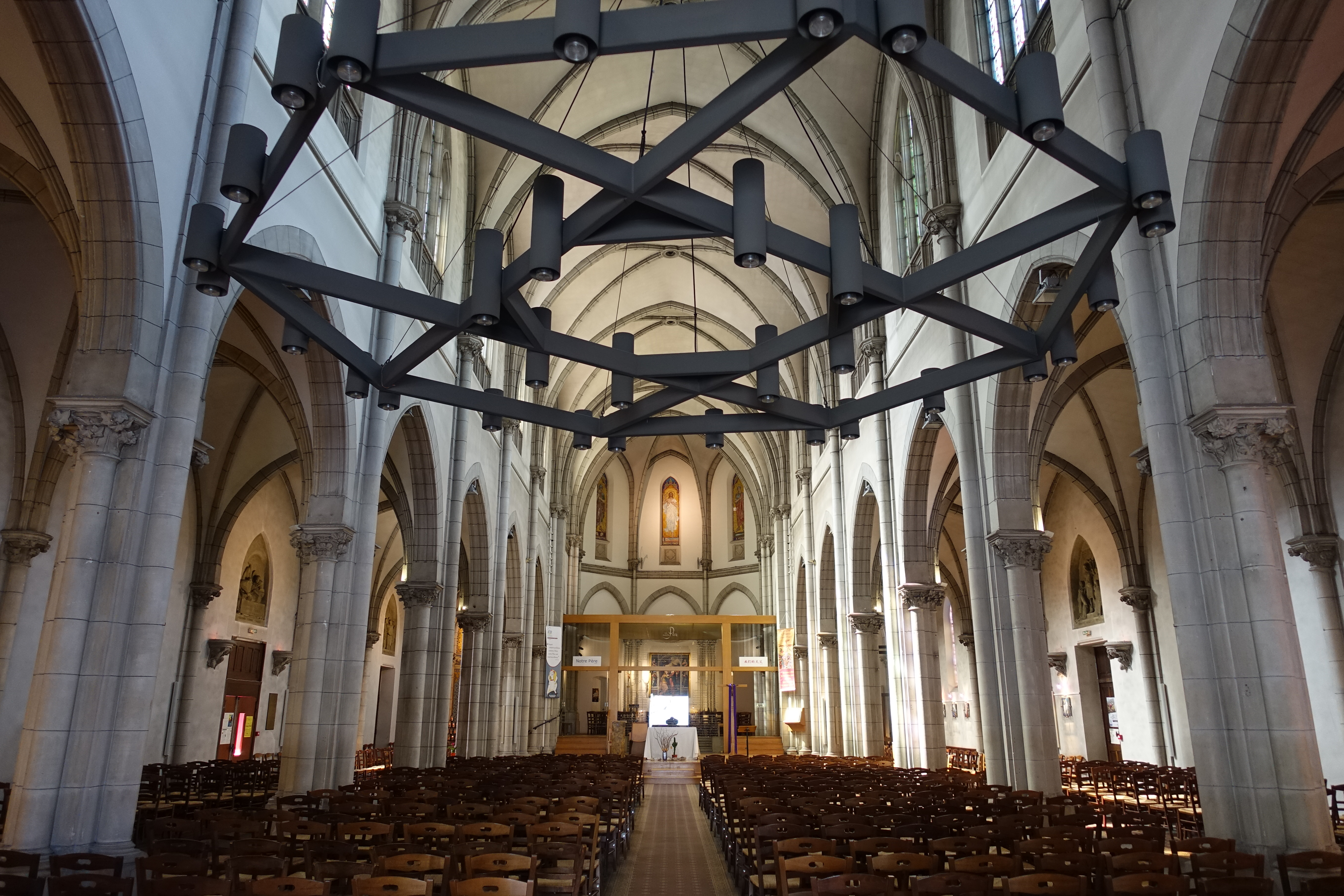
Te nave facing the choir

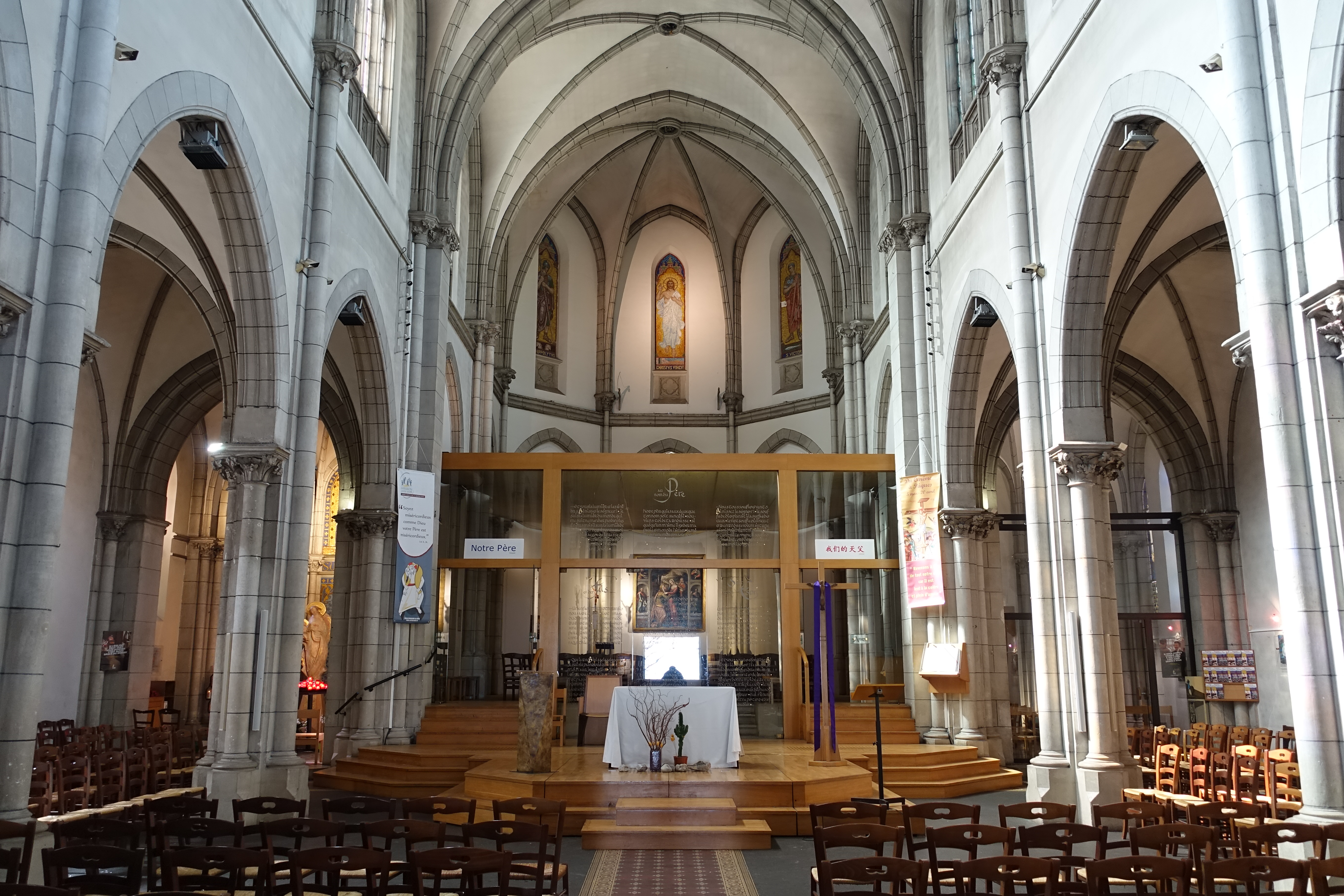
THe choir with the two apse chapels

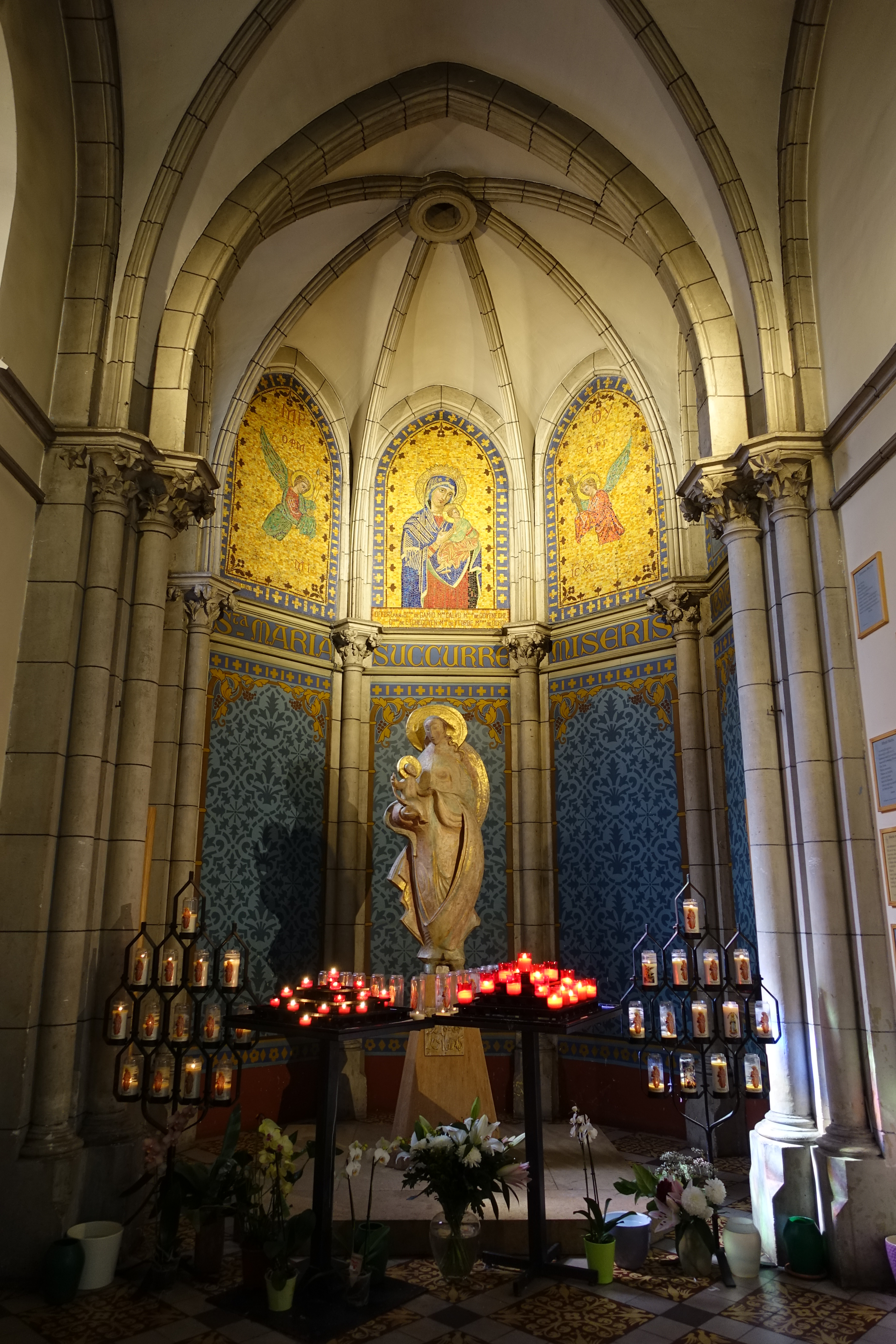
Chapel of the Virgin

=== Stained glass ===
The stained-glass windows of the church were made by the workshop of Lux Fournier in Tours, and completed in 1926

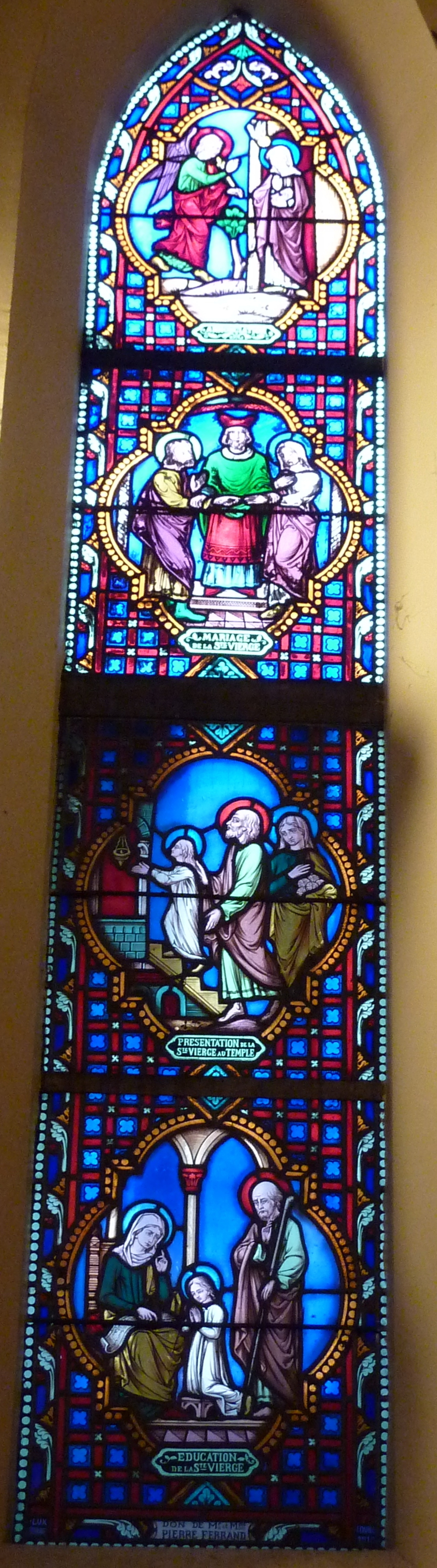
The Life of the Virgin Mary

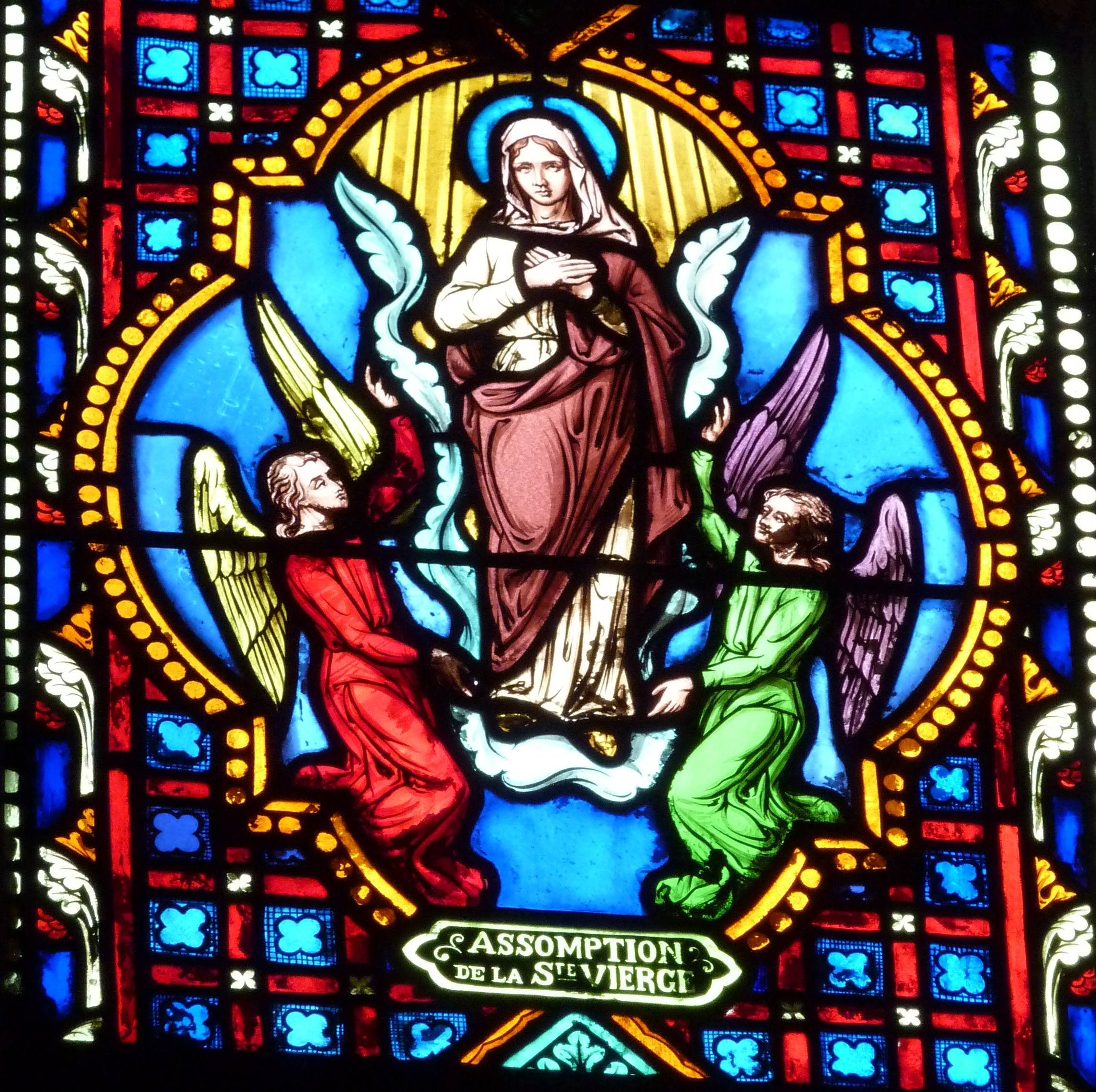
Angels transport the Virgin Mary to heaven

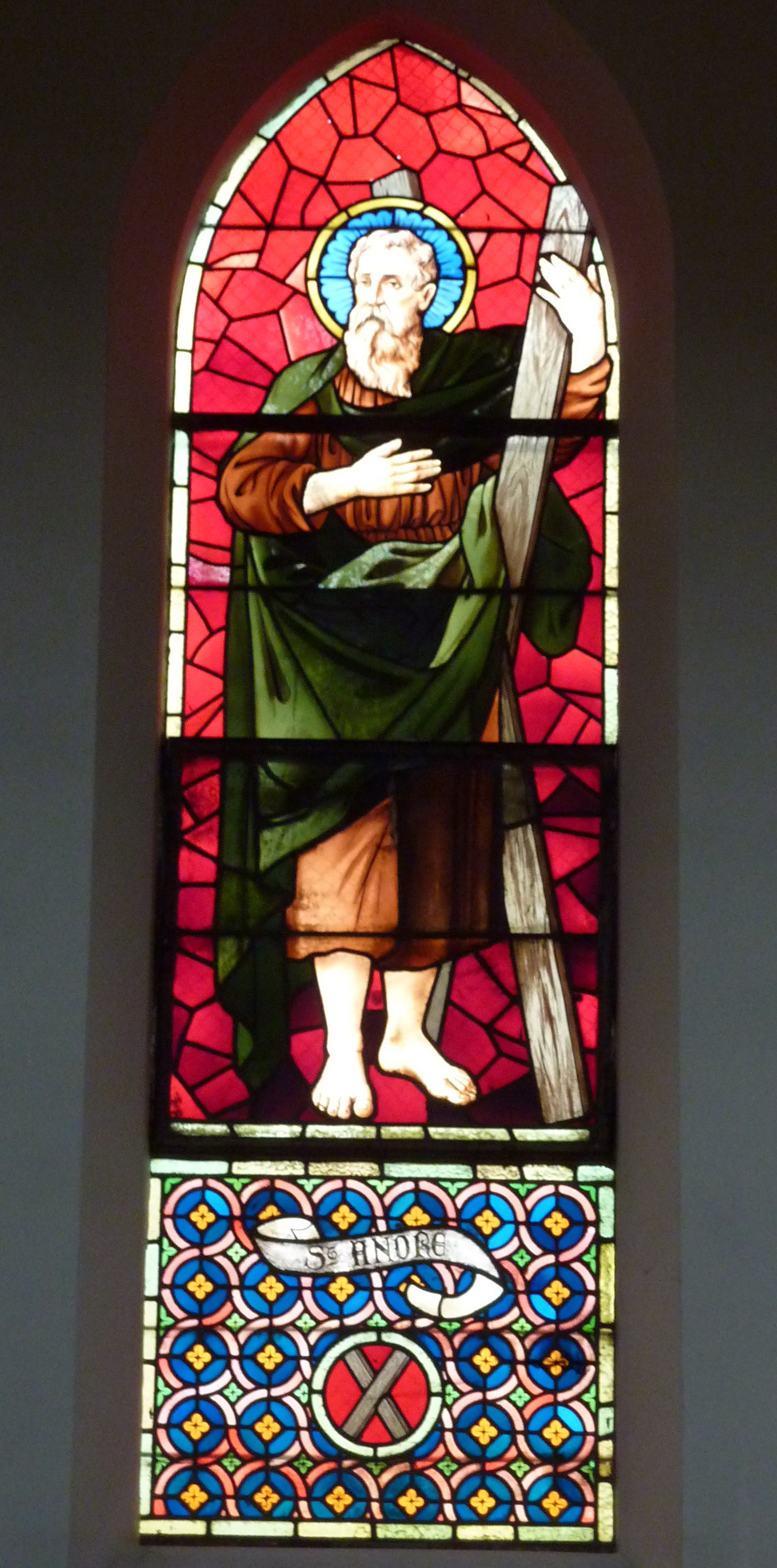
Saint Andrew

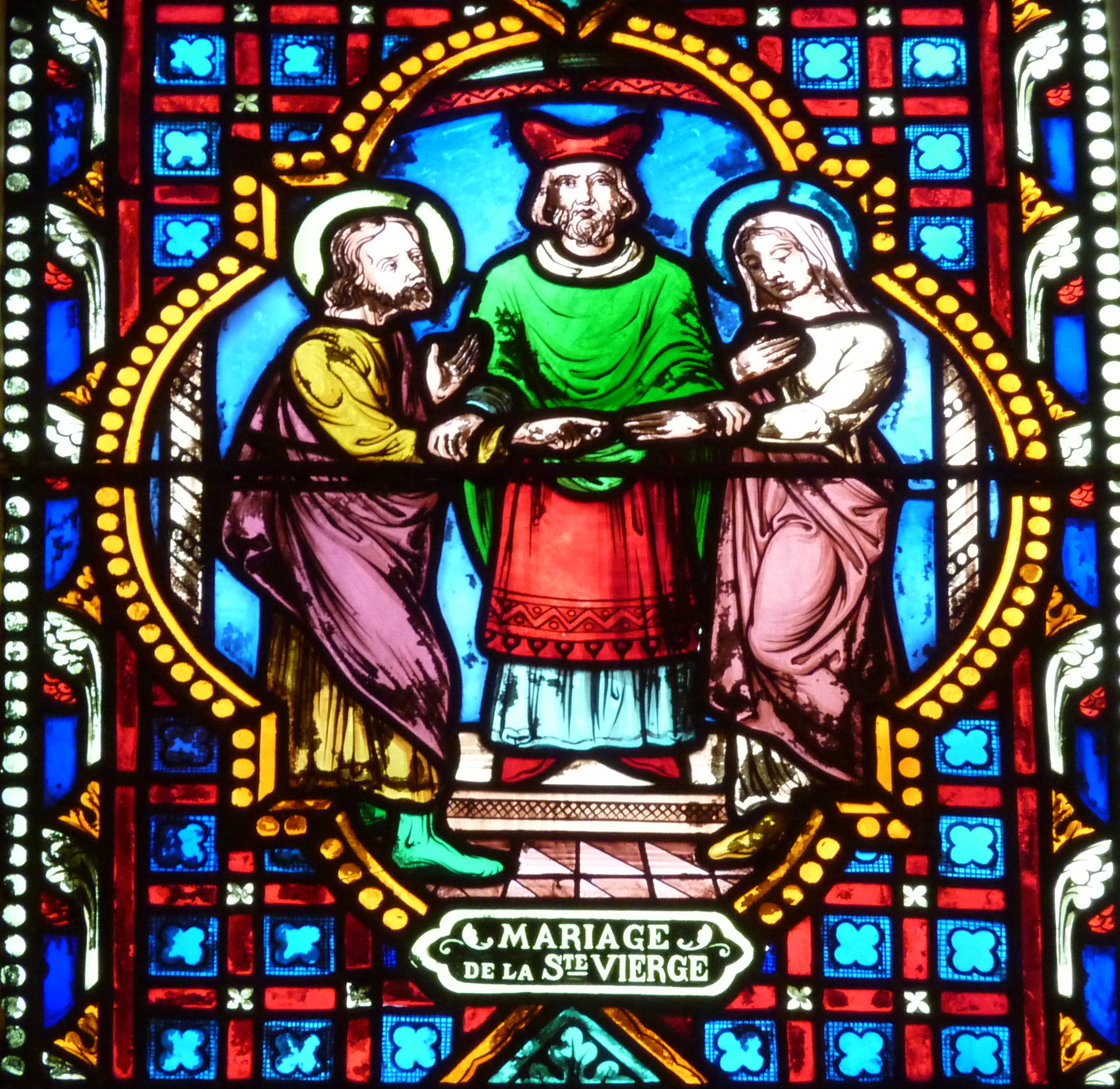
The marriage of the Virgin Mary

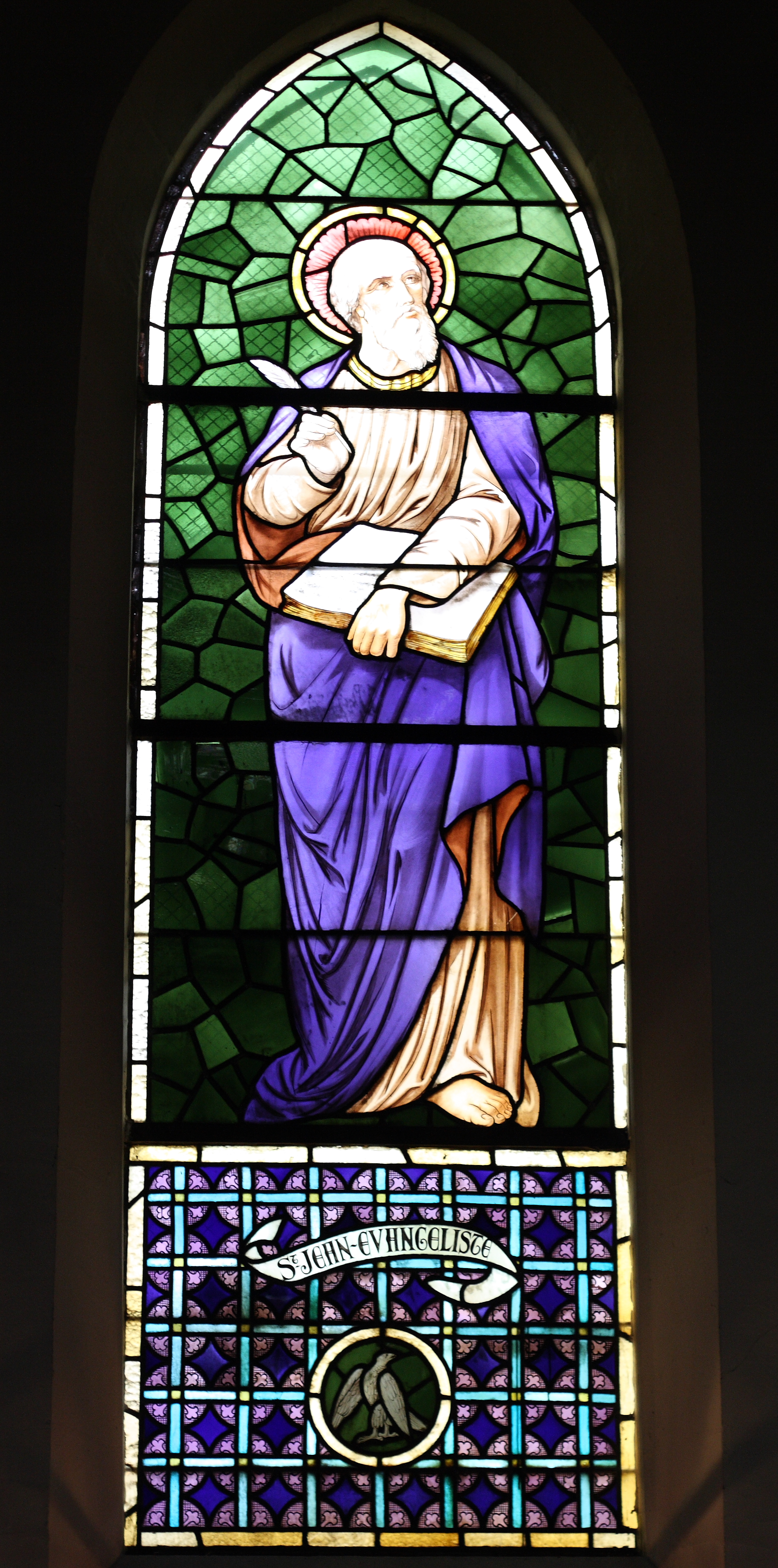
Saint John the Evangelist

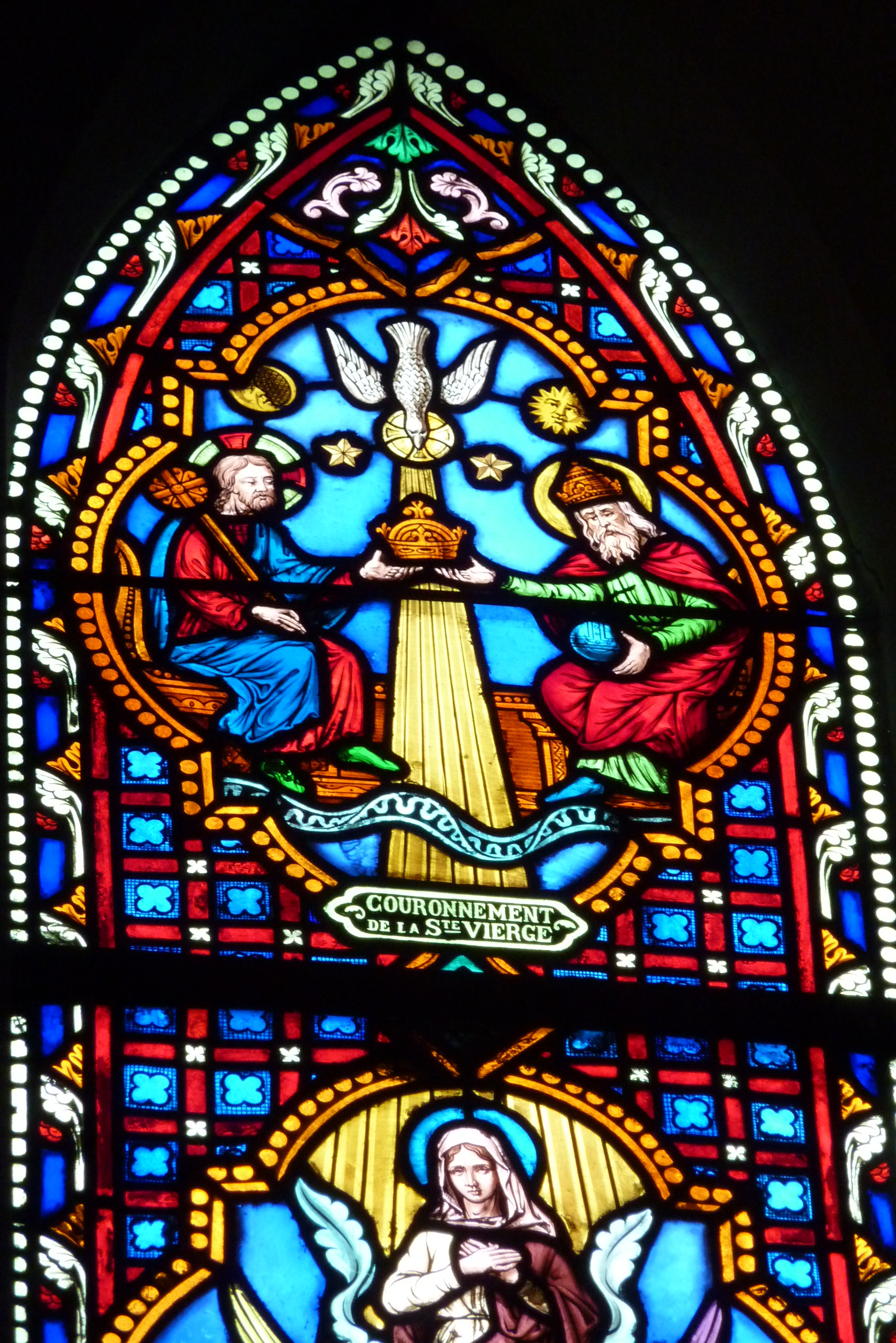
Crowning of the Holy Virgin (detail)

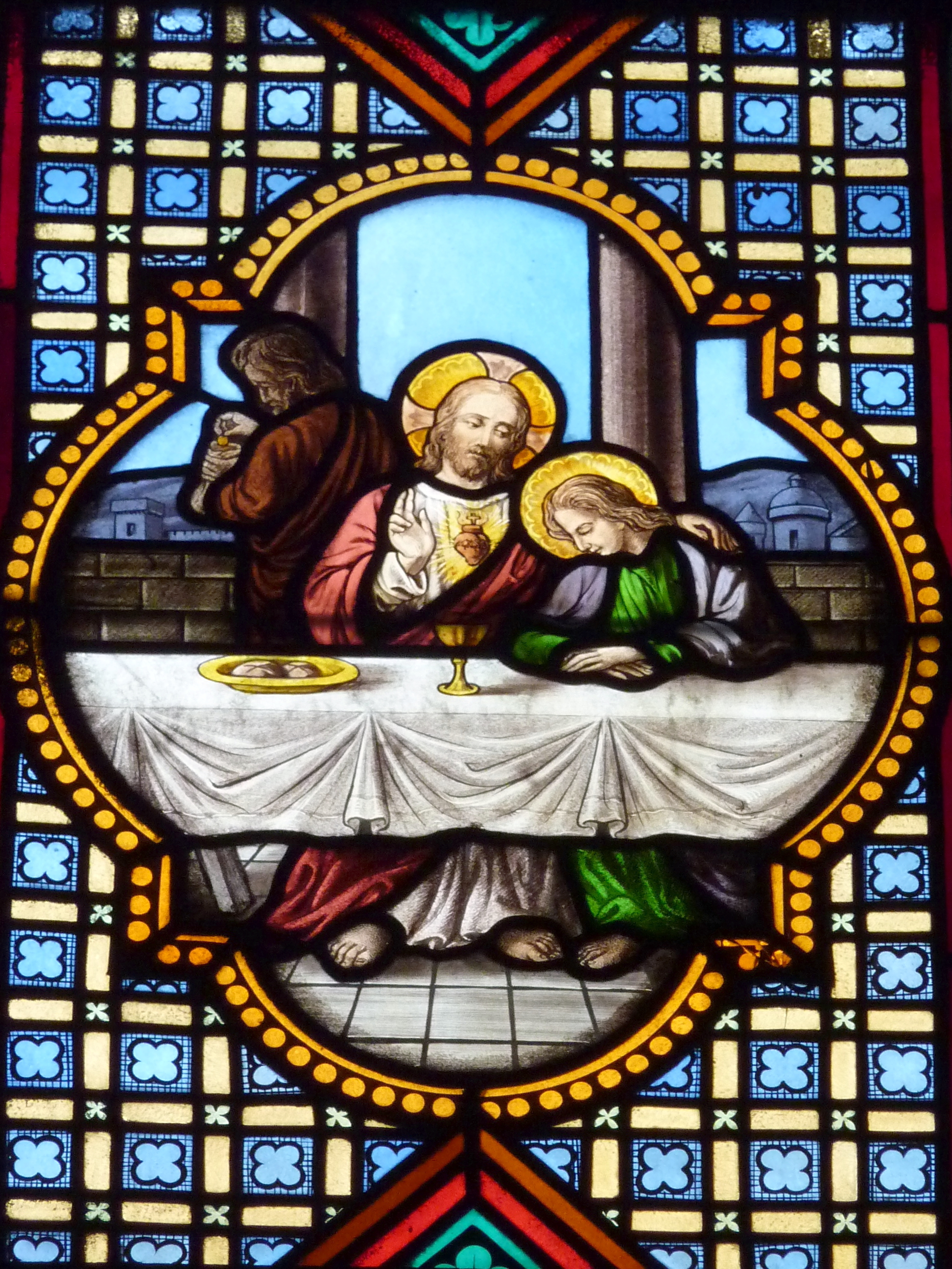
The Last Supper

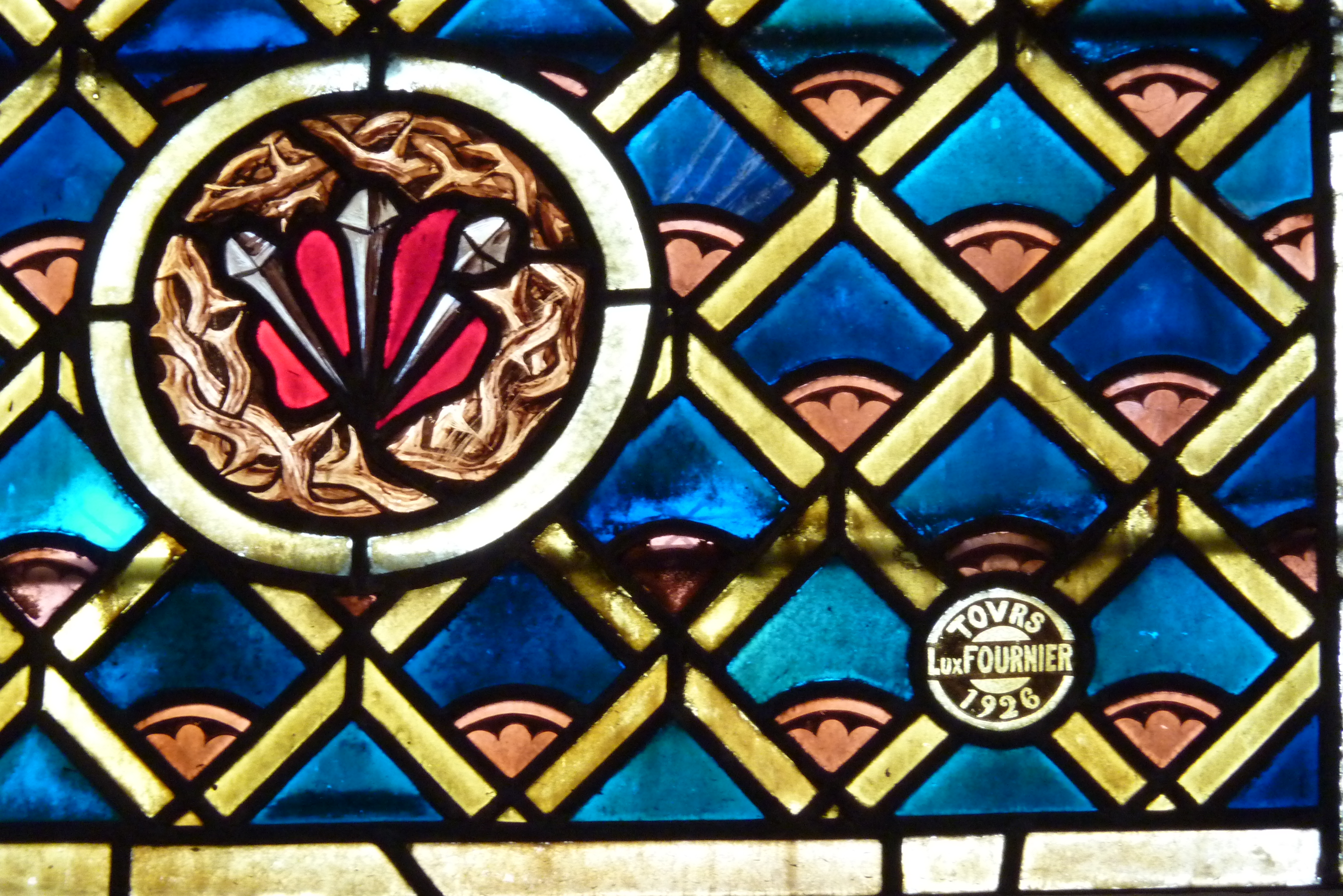
Signature of the window artists
