= Boulevard Hippolyte-Marquès =

Boulevard in Paris, France

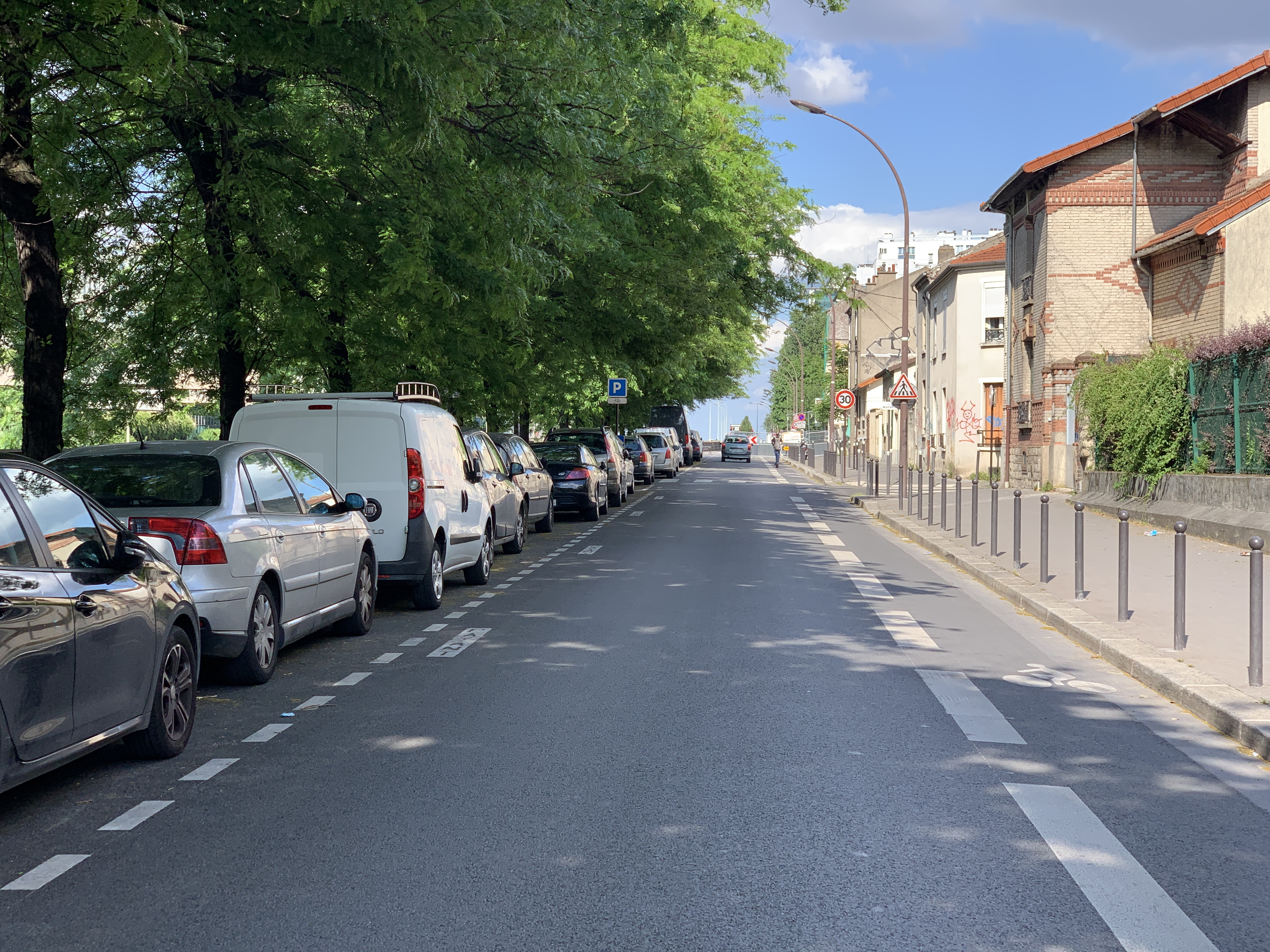

- Location within Paris
- Length: 515 m (1,690 ft)
- Width: 8 m (26 ft) (average)
- Arrondissement: 13th
- Quarter: Gare .
- Coordinates: 48°49′6″N 2°22′12″E
- From: avenue de la Porte d'Ivry
- To: avenue de la Porte de Choisy

The Boulevard Hippolyte-Marquès (formerly known as the Boulevard de la Zone) is a street in the 13th arrondissement of Paris. It has been planted with trees for much of its length of 515m and has an average width of 8m. It runs from the Avenue de la Porte d'Ivry to the Avenue de la Porte de Choisy. It now forms part of the ring-road around Paris, the Boulevard Périphérique.

One side marks the border of Ivry-sur-Seine from which it was annexed to Paris on 19 April 1929. Formerly named for the historical military zone, on 27 July 1945, it was renamed after Hippolyte Marquès.

The closest métro stations are Porte de Choisy (approx. 300 m) and Porte d'Ivry (approx. 300 m).
