= Rue Zadkine =

Street in Paris, France

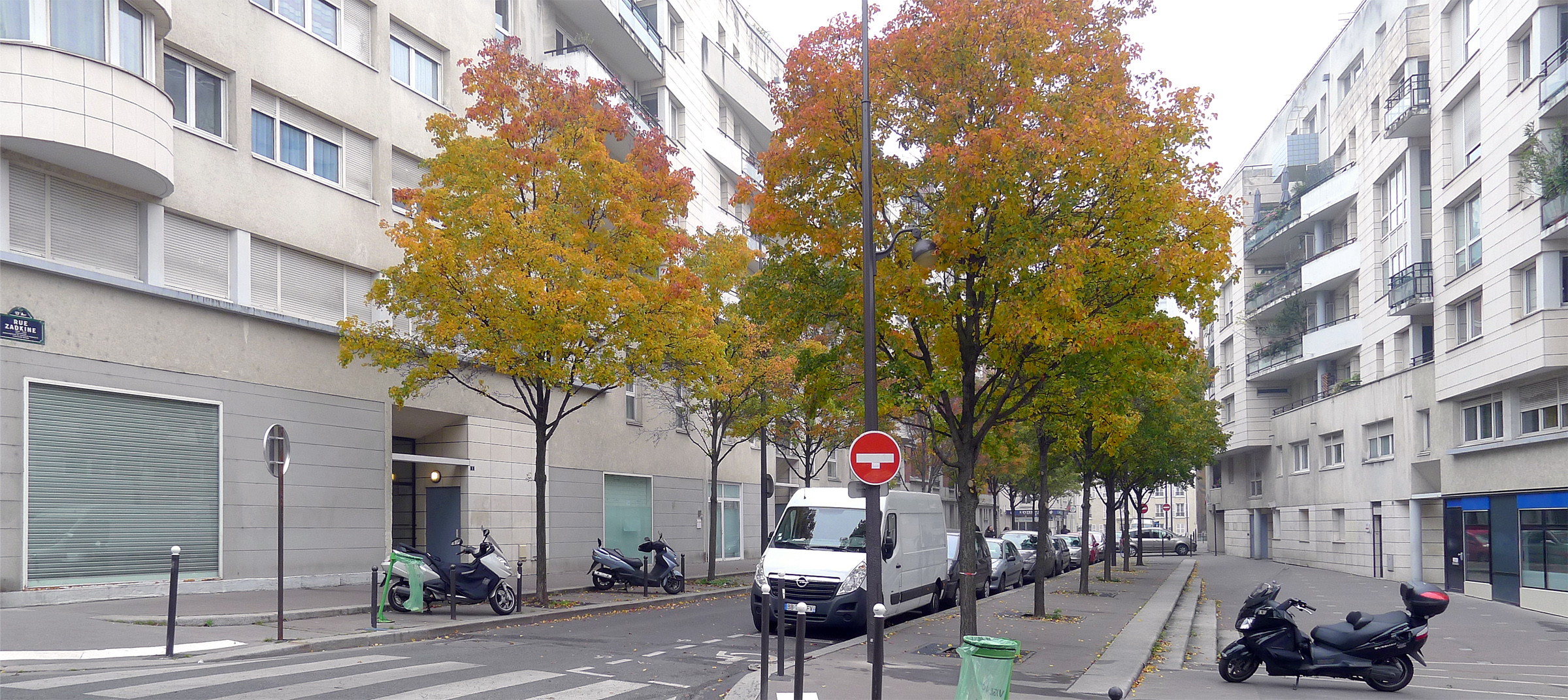

- Location within Paris
- Length: 90 m (300 ft)
- Width: 37 m (121 ft)
- Arrondissement: 13th
- Quarter: Gare.
- Coordinates: 48°49′55″N 2°22′10″E
- From: 19 Rue Duchefdelaville
- To: 9 Baudouin

Construction
- Completion: 1994
- Denomination: 14 January 1994

The Rue Zadkine is a commercial street in the 13th arrondissement of Paris, named after the sculptor of Russian descent Ossip Zadkine. It runs from the Rue Baudoin to the Rue Duchefdelaville. It has a length of some 90 m, and broadens from a width of 15 m to 25 m along its length.

The closest métro stations are:

- Chevaleret (approx. 300 m)
- Bibliothèque François Mitterrand (approx. 400 m).

One of Karina Bisch's paintings of contemporary situated buildings is entitled rue Zadkine (02.17).

== History ==
The street was created in 1994 during the development of the ZAC (Zone d’Aménagement Concerté) Chevaleret-Jeanne d'Arc. It was originally denominated CE/13. It covers the entirety of what was the cul-de-sac Duchefdelaville.

== Composition ==
- No. 1: The Galerie Kréo;
- No. 4: APF SESSD (Association des paralysés de France, Association of the paralysed) (Service de Soins Enfants, Childcare services);
- No. 5: Syndicat des Journalistes et Ecrivains (Trade Union of Journalists and Writers);
- No. 6: Geneviève Leblanc, national delegate for Miss France.

== Notable sites ==
It is within a kilometer of the following notable sites:

- Bibliothèque Nationale de France;
- Pont de Bercy;
- Pont de Tolbiac.
