= Teddy bears of the Gobelins =

Public event in Paris, France

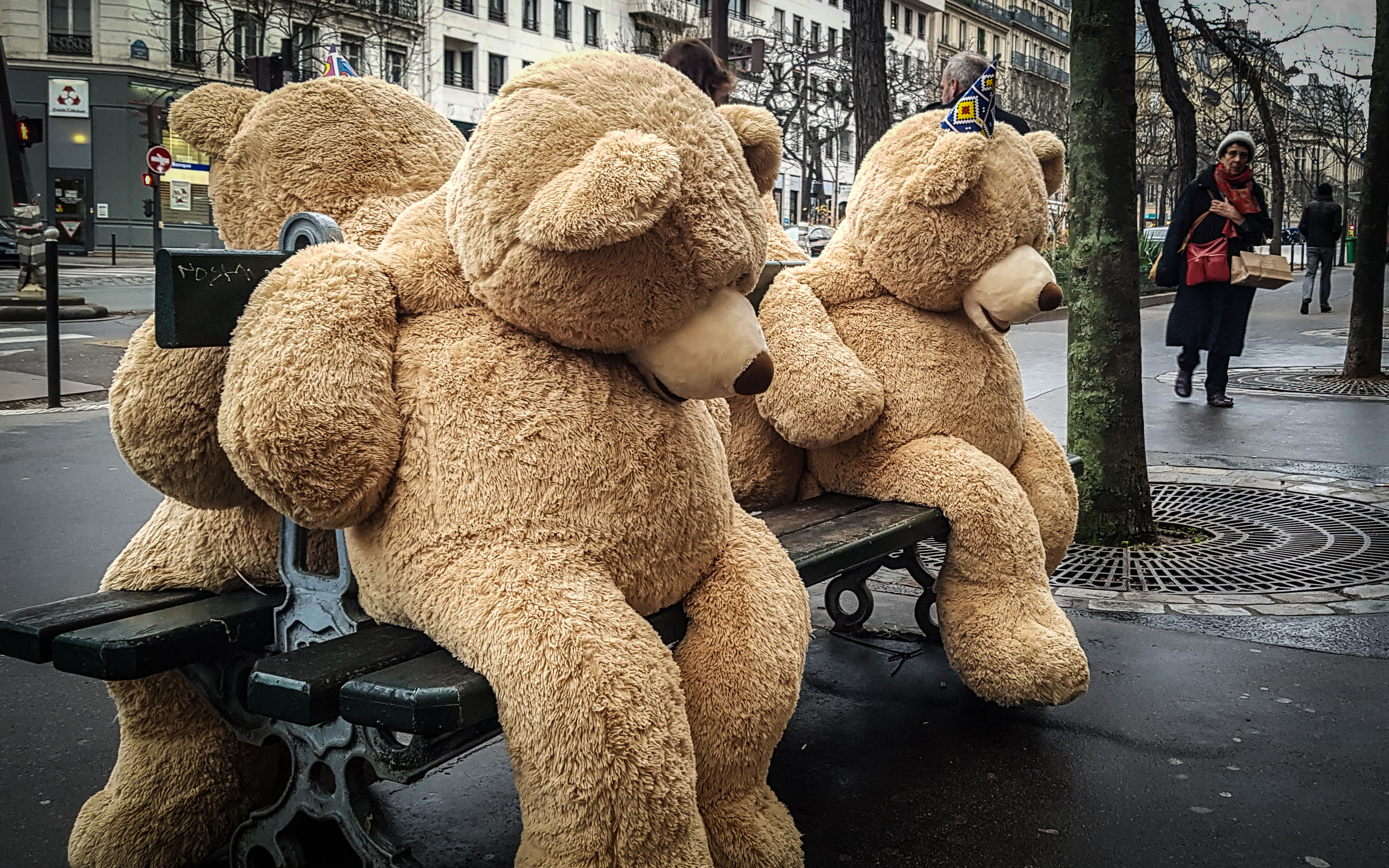
Four of the bears in December 2018

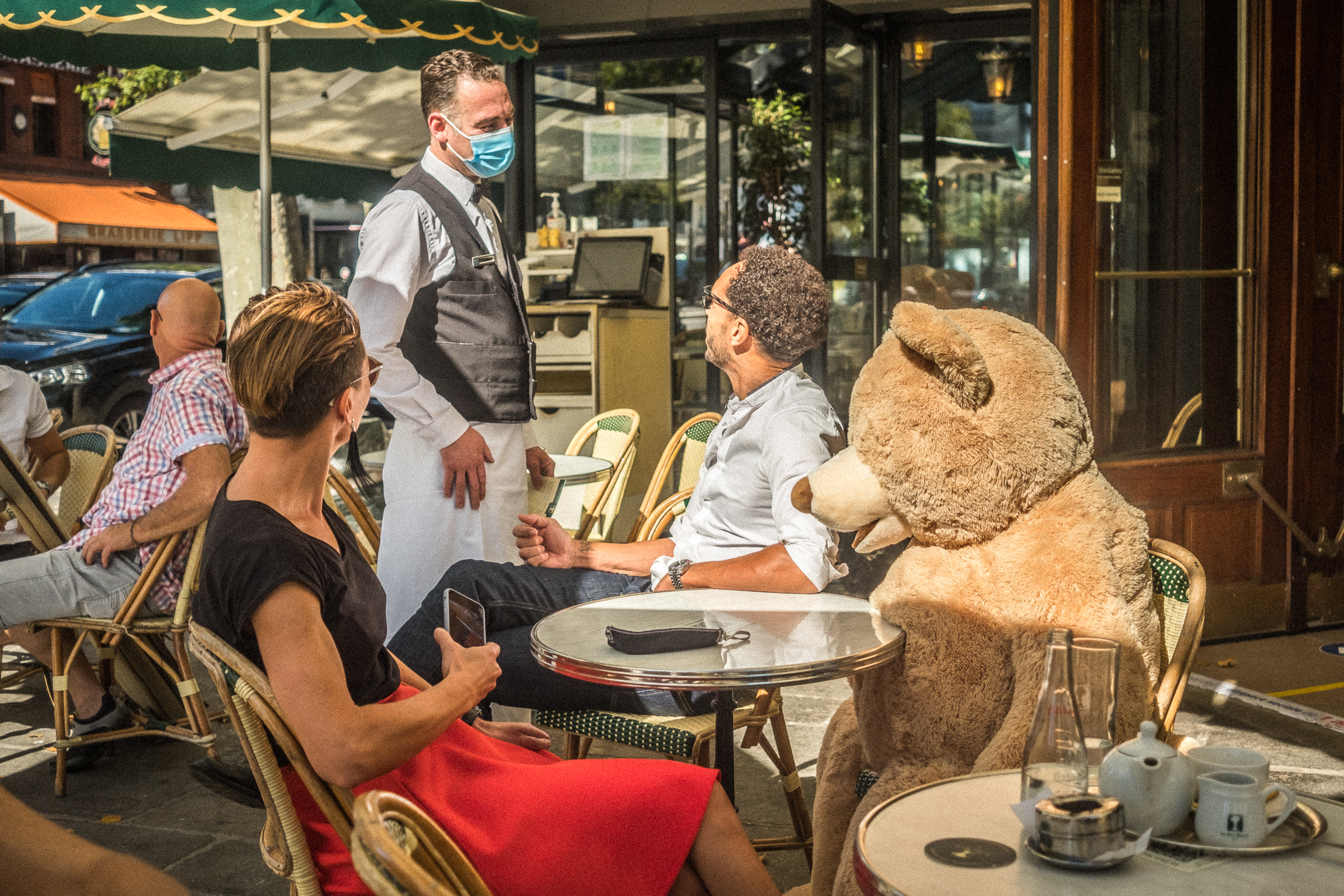
One of the bears at Deux Magots in Paris, 2020

In October 2018, the owner of a book shop in the Gobelins neighbourhood in the 13th arrondissement of Paris began lending out oversized teddy bears. Photographs of them in human poses in various local and wider Parisian settings have been widely circulated.

The Gobelins neighbourhood lies on the border between the 13th and 5th arrondissements, around the Gobelins Manufactory and the Les Gobelins Paris Metro station. Philippe Labourel, the owner of a book shop at 25 Avenue des Gobelins, posed a large teddy bear in his window in June 2018 and in mid-October began making them available on request for 48 hours and posting the resulting photos on social media. They are 1.4 metres (4 ft 7 in) tall and weigh 4.9 kilograms (11 lb), except for one at 2.4 metres (7 ft 10 in). Initially offered to six neighbouring businesses, they have since been sighted in all the other businesses on the avenue, at bus stops, on the sign pole of the Metro station, in the windows of the mairie (town hall) of the 13th arrondissement, on the Place d'Italie, 37 were photographed in the windows of the Grand Hôtel des Gobelins, and a police station borrowed two and named them Starsky and Hutch. On the associated Facebook page, which is run by a local pharmacist and had 225,000 views as of 22 November 2018, photos and videos by borrowers have been uploaded of the bears seeing the sights of Paris, riding around on a scooter, drinking at a bar and suffering the after-effects, and being treated for injuries at a clinic. The most viewed photo is to win a bear. The ad hoc group Protection des Ours des Gobelins Organisée (POGO: Organised Protection of the Gobelins Bears) reportedly guards against theft and mistreatment of the teddies.

At the end of the Christmas season in January 2019, the bears went into hibernation after a goodbye dinner at a local restaurant held on New Year's Day and a final appearance at the mairie. Expected to reappear in late 2019, they returned in April; Labourel announced in the summer that there had been a teddy bear wedding, attended by 2,800 people, and that the bears would expand out of the neighbourhood into other avenues.

The approximately 50 bears (only Labourel knows the exact number) are not for advertising, but purely to bring joy, particularly locally. Labourel bought them himself and says, "I've been working here for 25 years. There were people I had never spoken to. Now they call me Philippe." He has suggested that they are "from Central Europe" and left because of deforestation; he has also said his own teddy bear, Gorille (Gorilla) complained about not having a teddy of his own.

During the COVID-19 pandemic, Labourel increased the number of bears and distributed them more widely throughout Paris. During the lockdown in spring 2020, they reminded people of social distancing by wearing masks and carrying attestations granting permission to be outside, and they continued to sit in closed restaurants after lockdown ended.
