= 13th arrondissement of Paris =

Municipal arrondissement in France

- Municipal arrondissement
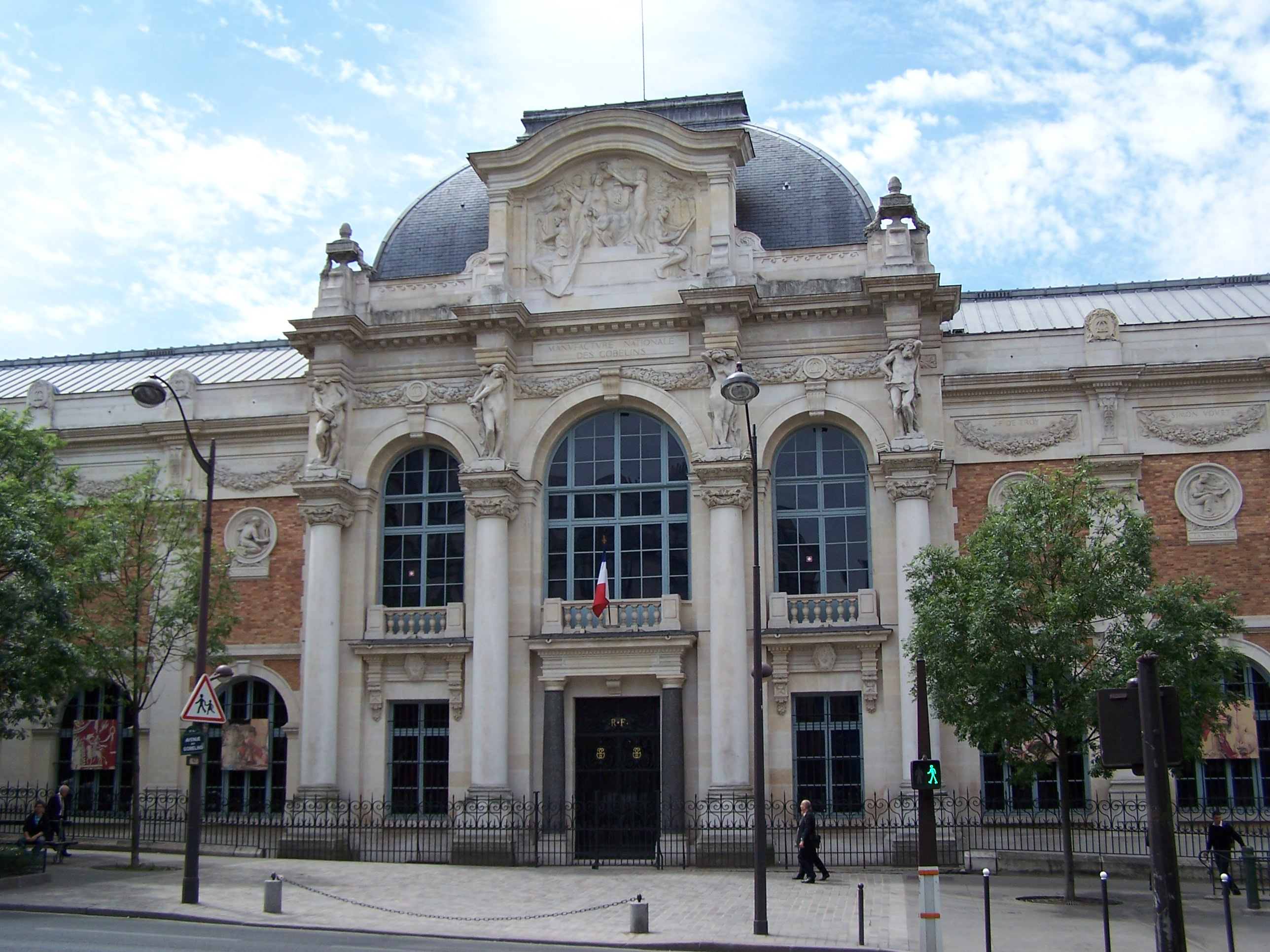
- Gobelins Manufactory

- Coat of arms

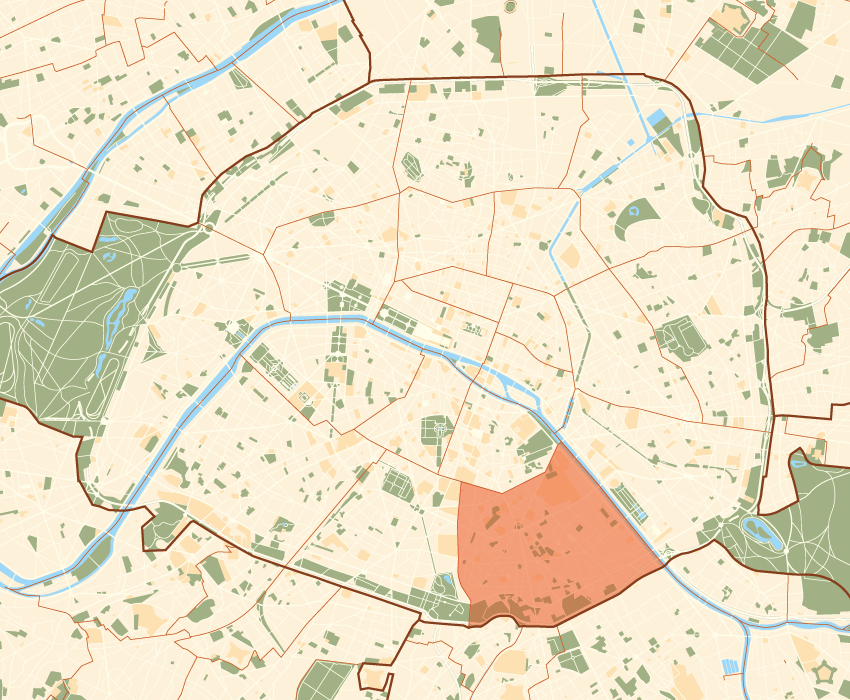
- Location within Paris
- Coordinates: 48°49′56″N 2°21′20″E
- Country: France
- Region: Île-de-France
- Department: Paris
- Commune: Paris

Government
  - Mayor (2020–2026): Jérôme Coumet (DVG)
- Area: 7.15 km^{2} (2.76 sq mi)
- Population (2023): 181,271
  - Density: 25,400/km^{2} (65,700/sq mi)
- INSEE code: 75113

The 13th arrondissement of Paris (XIII^{e} arrondissement) is one of the 20 arrondissements of Paris. In spoken French, the arrondissement is referred to as le treizième ("the thirteenth"). In 2023, it had a population of 181,271.

The arrondissement is situated on the left bank of the River Seine. It is home to Paris's principal Asian community, the Quartier Asiatique, located in the southeast of the arrondissement in an area that contains many high-rise apartment buildings. The neighbourhood features a high concentration of Chinese and Vietnamese businesses.

The current mayor has been Jérôme Coumet (originally elected as a Socialist, now miscellaneous left) since 2007. He was reelected by the arrondissement council on 29 March 2008 after the list which he headed gained 70% of the votes cast in the second round of the 2008 municipal election. He was again reelected on 13 April 2014 and on 11 July 2020.

The 13th arrondissement is also home to the Bibliothèque nationale de France's François Mitterrand site and the newly built business district of Paris Rive Gauche.

== Demographics ==
The 13th arrondissement is still growing in population, mainly because of an influx of Asian immigrants. During the late 1970s and early 1980s, the first wave of Vietnamese refugees from the Vietnam War settled in the arrondissement, largely concentrated near Masséna Boulevard. Later waves of refugees and Asian immigrants transitioned from being exclusively ethnic Vietnamese to include ethnic Chinese from Vietnam, Laotians and Cambodians. These migrants largely settled in the southern area of the arrondissement, creating an Asian quarter and establishing a commercial district and community institutions. Teochew, Cantonese, Vietnamese, Lao and Khmer are spoken by many residents in the community.

The 13th arrondissement is also rapidly growing in business activity, thanks to the new business district of Paris Rive Gauche. In 1999, the arrondissement contained 89,316 jobs, a number that has since grown.

=== Historical population ===
Historical population

Year	Pop.	±% p.a.
1861	56,798	—
1872	69,431	+1.84%
1881	91,735	+3.14%
1891	110,956	+1.92%
1901	127,874	+1.43%
1911	142,386	+1.08%
1921	150,883	+0.58%
1931	164,671	+0.88%
1936	170,449	+0.69%
1946	159,722	−0.65%
1954	165,620	+0.45%

Year	Pop.	±% p.a.
1962	166,709	+0.08%
1968	158,280	−0.86%
1975	163,313	+0.45%
1982	170,818	+0.64%
1990	171,098	+0.02%
1999	171,533	+0.03%
2007	179,213	+0.55%
2012	182,386	+0.35%
2017	182,099	−0.03%
2023	181,271	−0.08%

Source: Demographia (1861-1999) and INSEE (1876-2023)

=== Immigration ===
Place of birth of residents of the 13th arrondissement in 1999
Born in metropolitan France	Born outside metropolitan France			
76.2%	23.8%			
76.2%	Born in overseas France	Born in foreign countries with French citizenship at birth^{1}	EU-15 immigrants^{2}	Non-EU-15 immigrants
76.2%	1.8%	4.5%	2.9%	14.6%
^{1} This group is made up largely of former French settlers, such as pieds-noirs in Northwest Africa, followed by former colonial citizens who had French citizenship at birth (such as was often the case for the native elite in French colonies), as well as to a lesser extent foreign-born children of French expatriates. A foreign country is understood as a country not part of France in 1999, so a person born for example in 1950 in Algeria, when Algeria was an integral part of France, is nonetheless listed as a person born in a foreign country in French statistics.^{2} An immigrant is a person born in a foreign country not having French citizenship at birth. An immigrant may have acquired French citizenship since moving to France, but is still considered an immigrant in French statistics. On the other hand, persons born in France with foreign citizenship (the children of immigrants) are not listed as immigrants.

== Map ==
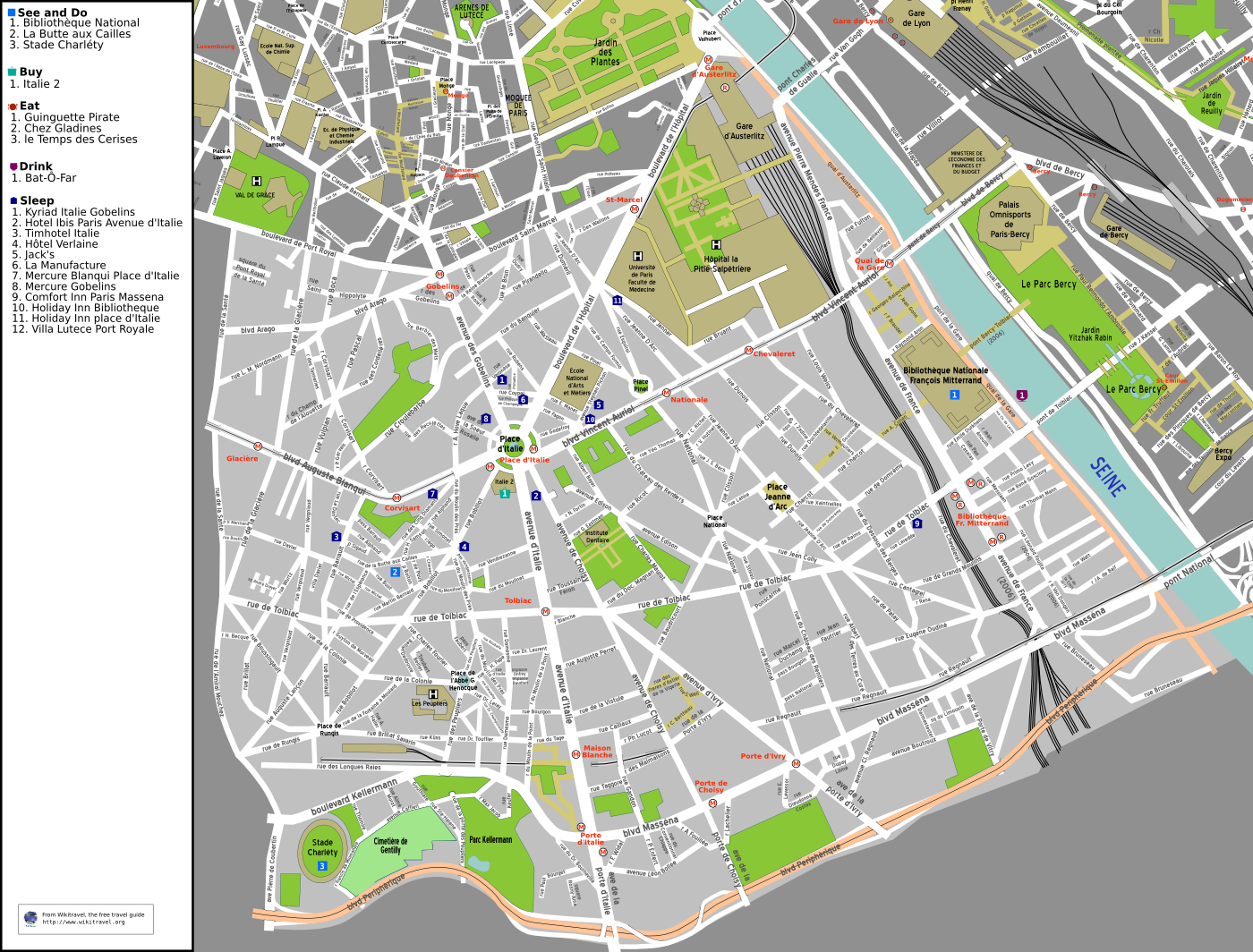
Map of the 13th arrondissement

== Economy ==
The head office of Accor, including the company's executive management, is in the Immeuble Odyssey in the 13th arrondissement. This facility is the company's registered office.

Ubisoft has its business office in the arrondissement.

== Education ==
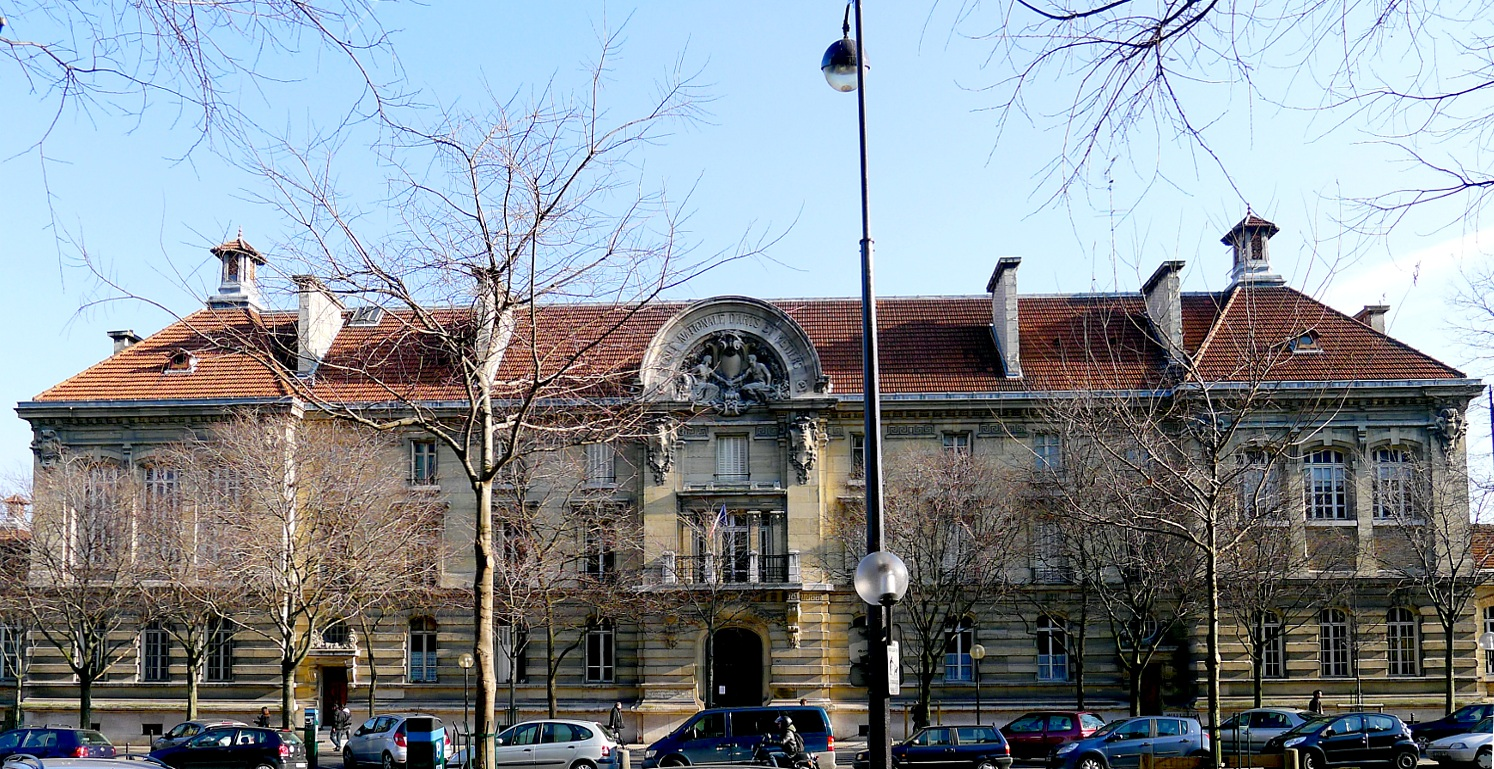
Arts et Métiers ParisTech campus (1912) on Boulevard de l'Hôpital

Senior high schools:

- Lycée Rodin
- Lycée Claude-Monet
- Lycée professionnel Corvisart-Tolbiac
- École nationale de chimie physique et biologie de Paris
- École Yabné
- Groupe scolaire Notre Dame de France
- Groupe scolaire Saint Vincent de Paul
- Lycée Le Rebours
- Lycée Technique Privé de l'École Technique Supérieure du Laboratoire

The 13th arrondissement is home to engineering graduate schools Arts et Métiers ParisTech and Télécom ParisTech. The teaching and learning center is settled at the number 151.

== Cityscape ==
=== Quarters ===
The quarters of the 13th arrondissement

The arrondissement consists of four quarters:

- Quartier Salpêtrière (49)
- Quartier Gare (50)
- Quartier Maison-Blanche (51)
- Quartier Croulebarbe (52)

=== Places of interest ===
- Paris's main Asian district, the Quartier Asiatique, also locally called la Triangle de Choisy or la petite Asie ("Little Asia"), is located in the southeast of the arrondissement. The following can be found in this area:
  - Les Olympiades, Super-Italie and various other towers among the tallest in Paris
  - Tang Frères and Paristore Asian supermarkets and grocery stores.
- Bibliothèque nationale de France (François Mitterrand site)
- Pitié-Salpêtrière Hospital
- Butte-aux-Cailles
- Gare d'Austerlitz
- Gobelins Manufactory
- Art Ludique - Le Musée, first French museum dedicated to the art of entertainment
- University of Chicago Center in Paris
- 6 Villa des Gobelins - residence of Hồ Chí Minh from July 1919 to July 1921
- Notre-Dame de la Gare, Historic church from the 19th century
- Stade Sébastien Charléty, home of football clubs Paris FC and Paris Saint-Germain Féminines
- Cité de la mode et du design, a creative schedule of events built around innovation, culture, and style.
- Street Art 13 frescoes
- Teddy bears of the Gobelins, photographed around the neighborhood
- Parc Kellermann, a public park

=== Streets and squares ===
- Rue Zadkine
- Rue Paul-Klee
- Rue Marcel-Duchamp
- Boulevard de la Zone
- Place d'Italie
- Place Jean-Michel Basquiat
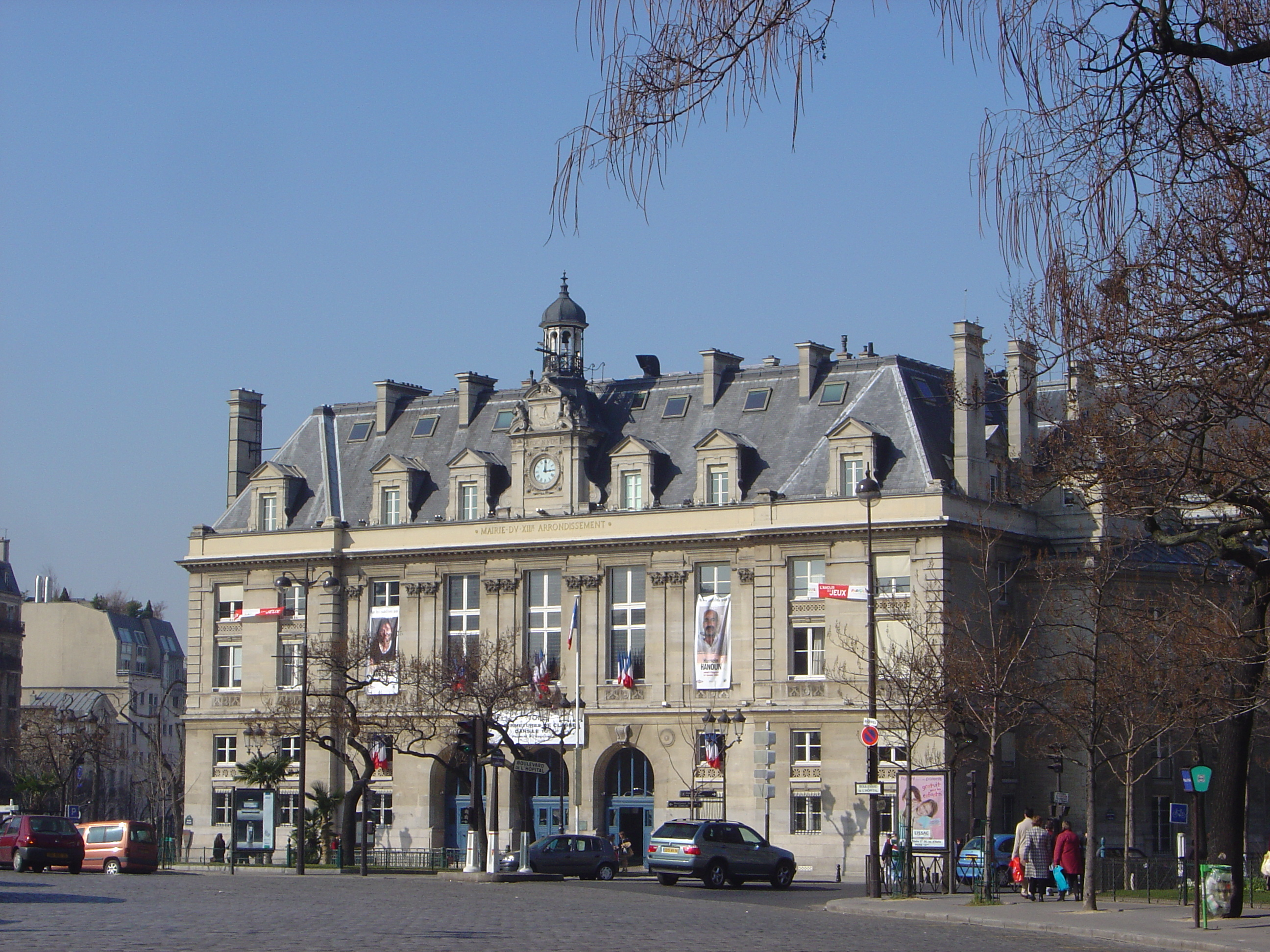
City hall in the 13th arrondissement

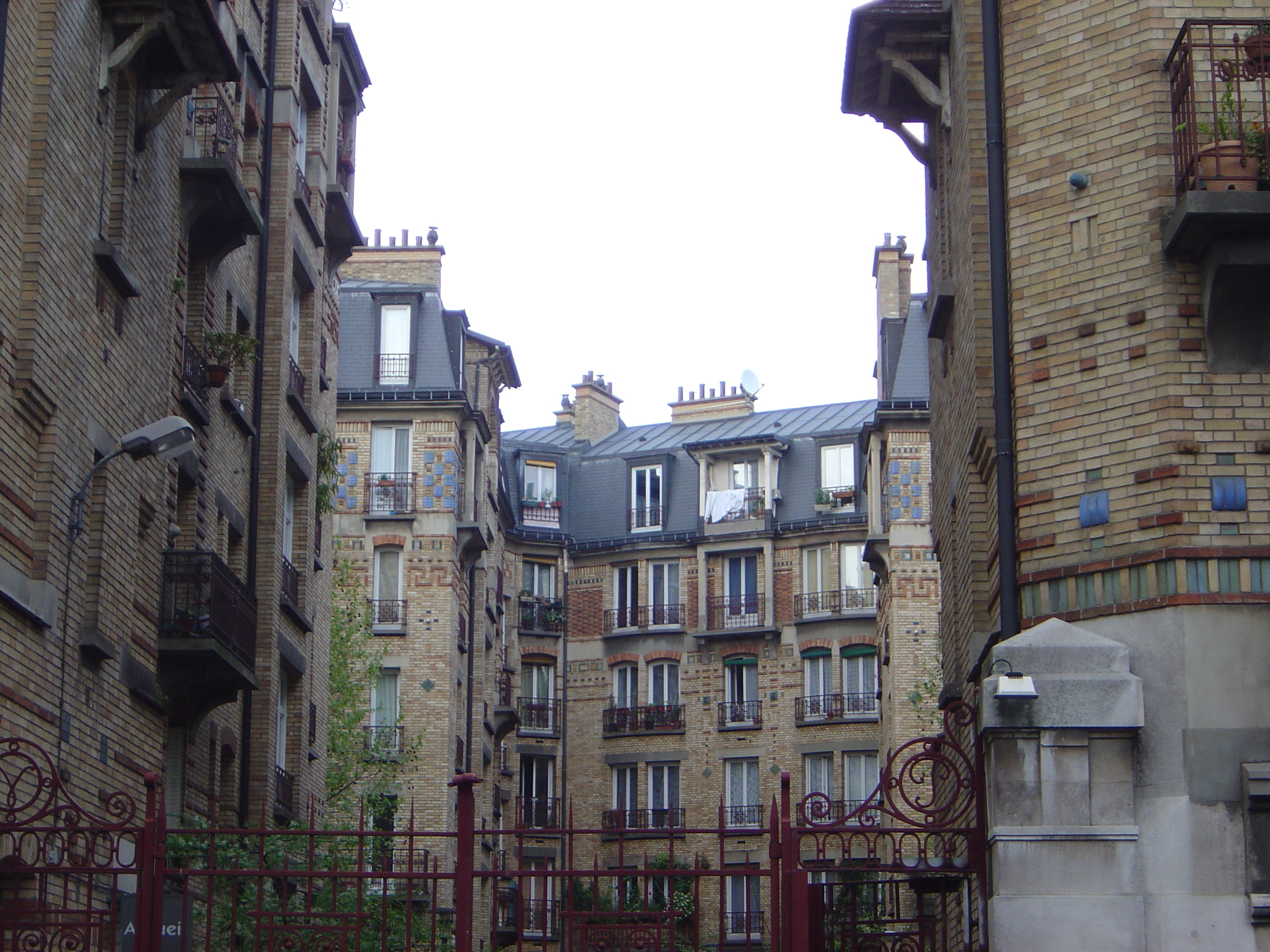
Public housing built in the first half of the 20th century

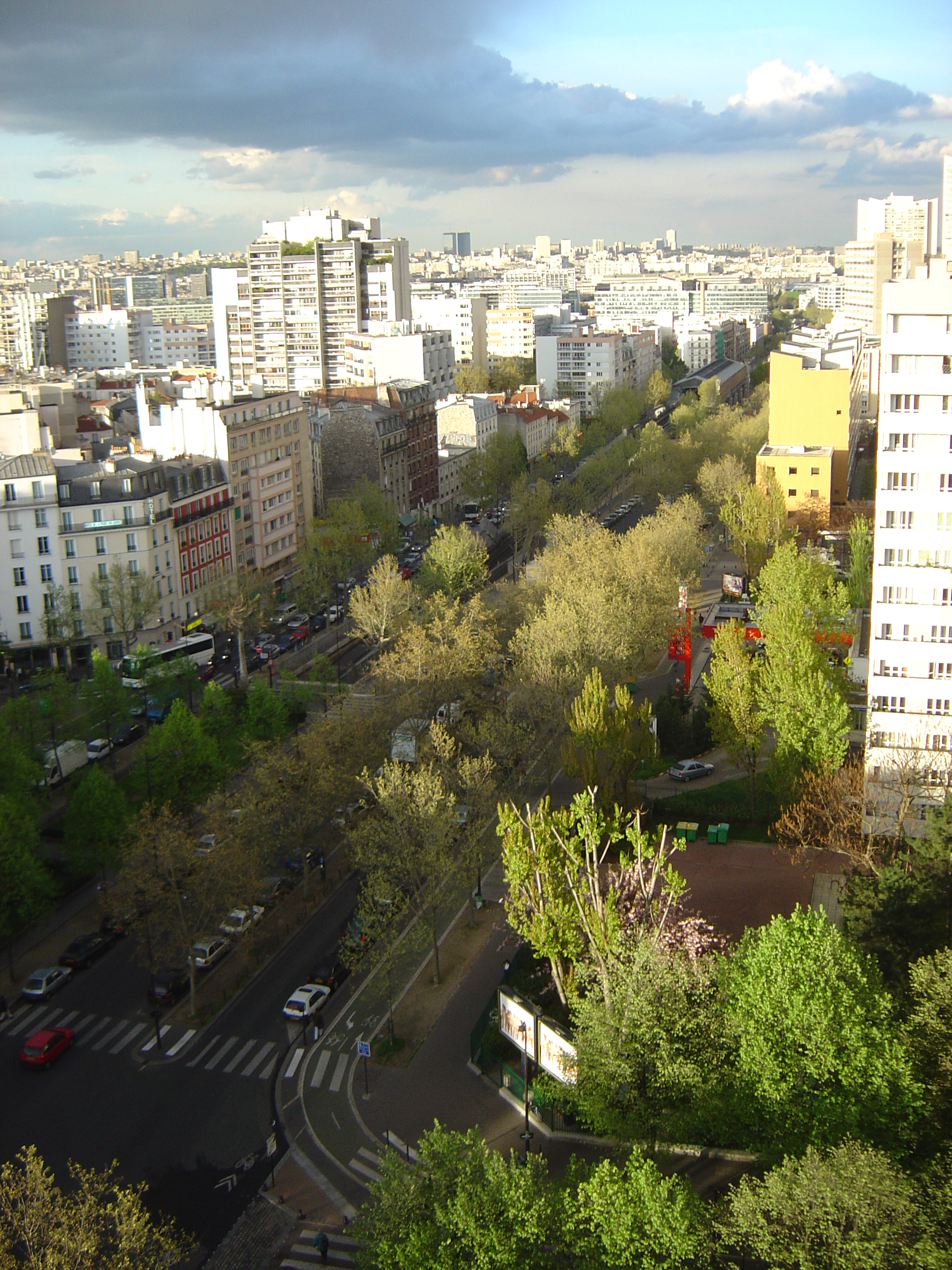
Boulevard Vincent Auriol

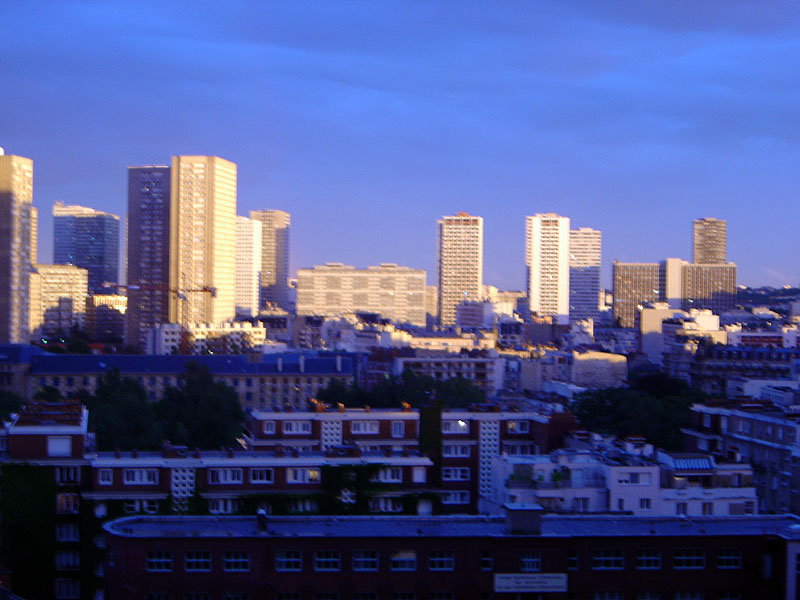
A large section of the 13th arrondissement was rebuilt in modernist style in the 1970s

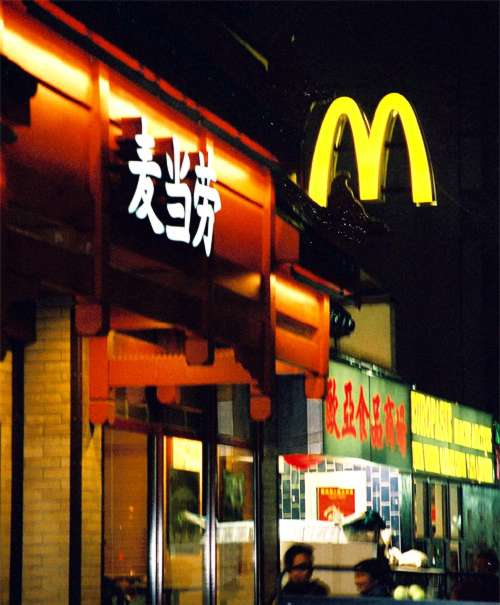
McDonald's in the 13th arrondissement's Chinatown

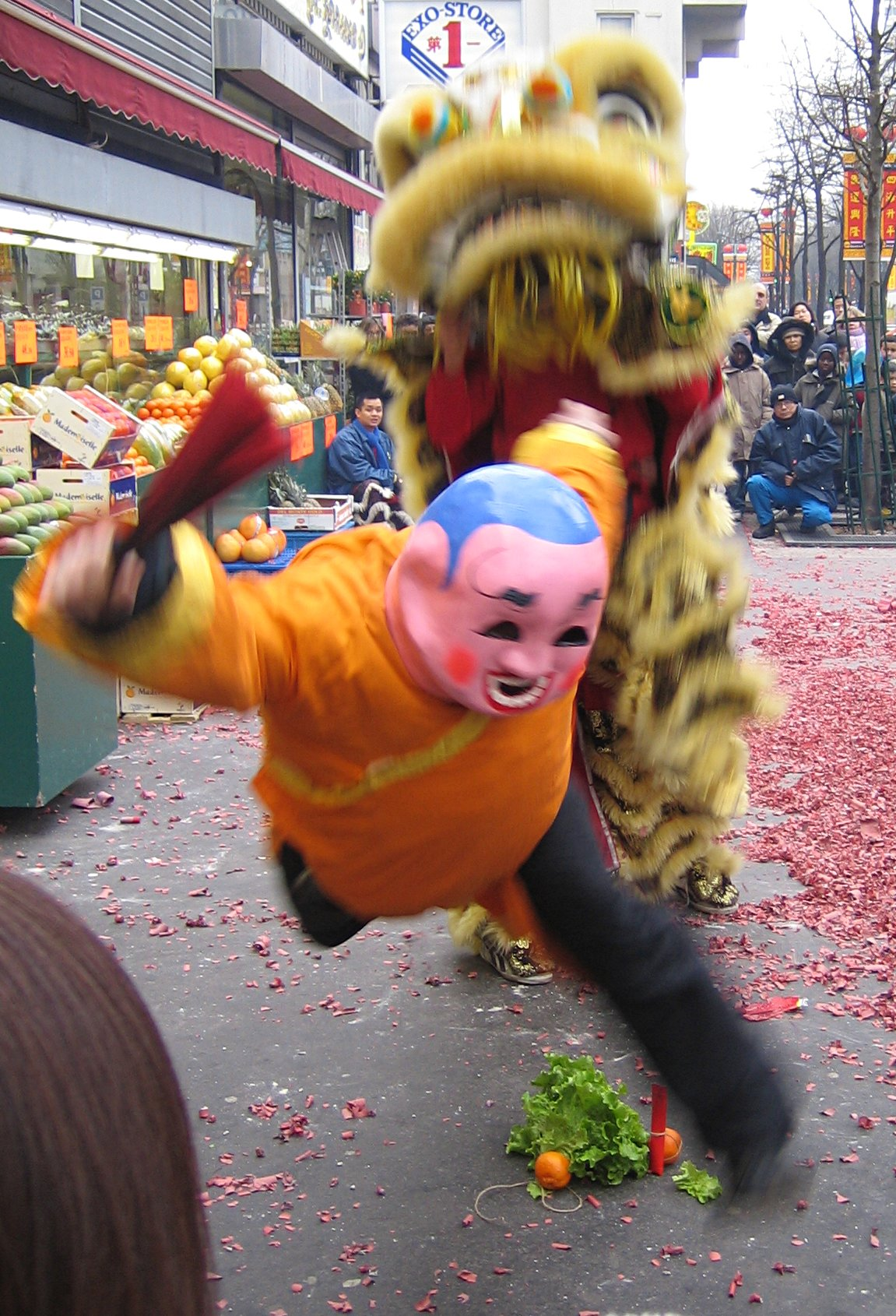
Chinese New Year celebrations in the 13th arrondissement

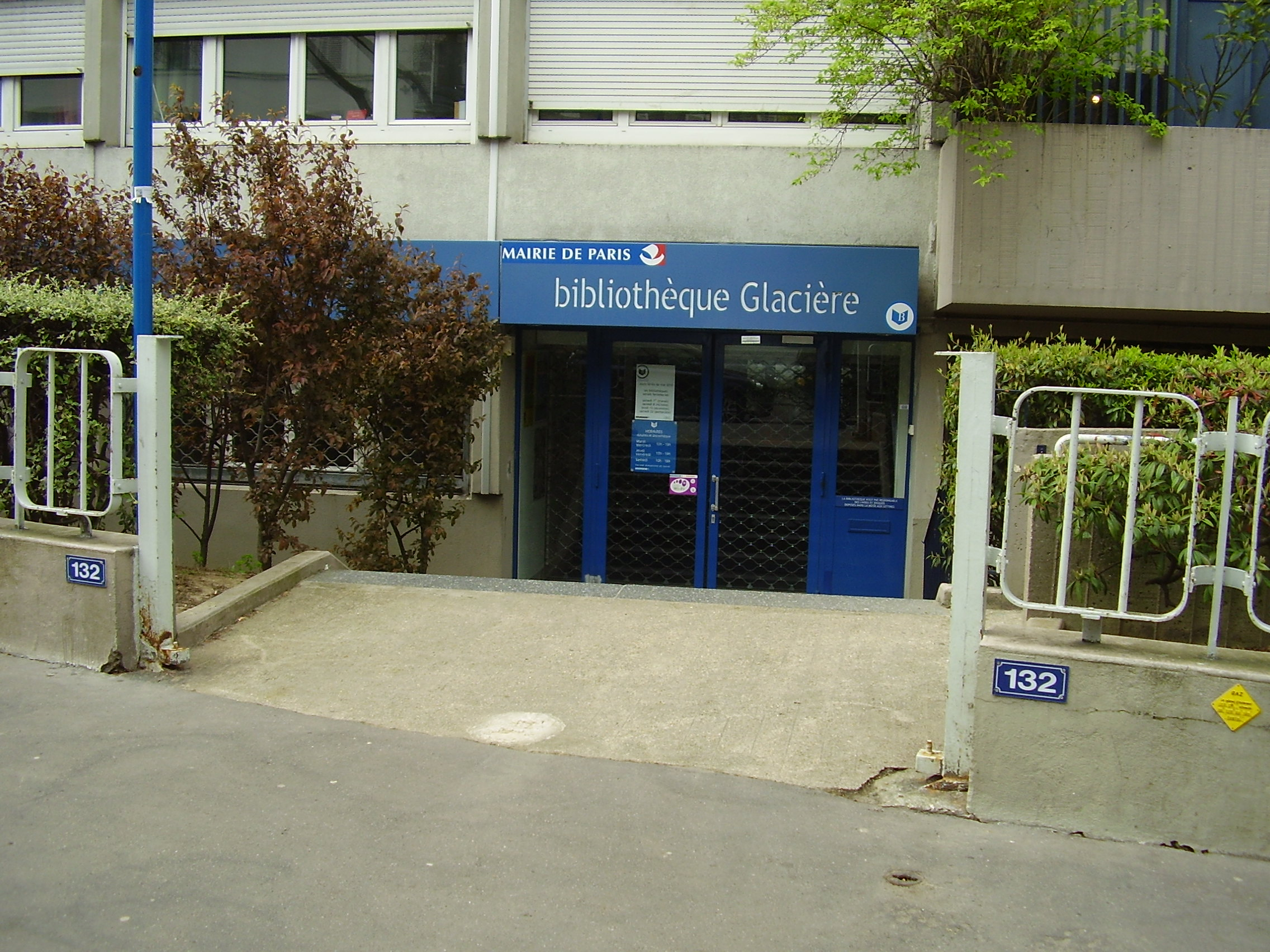
Library Glacière

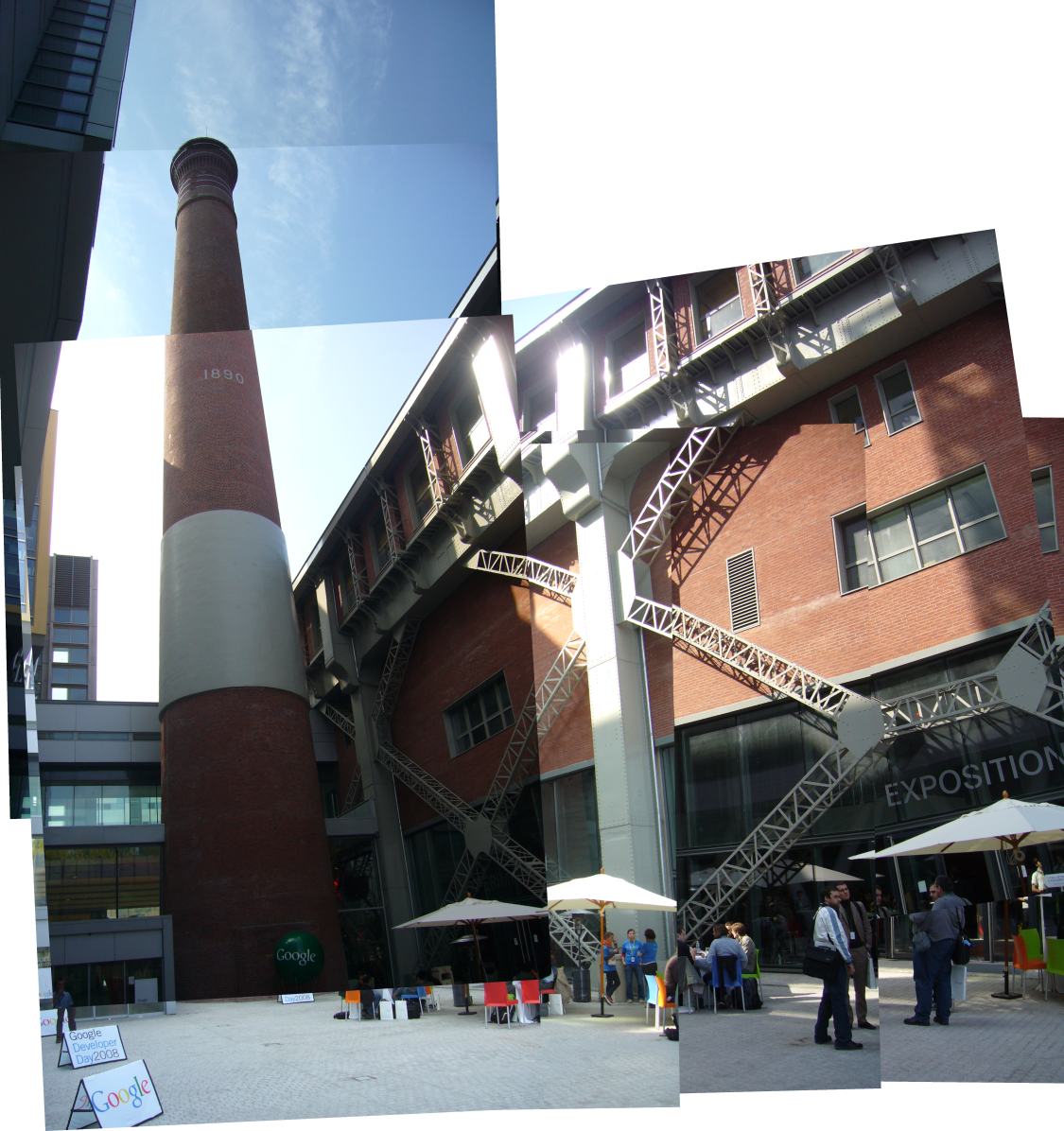
National School of Architecture
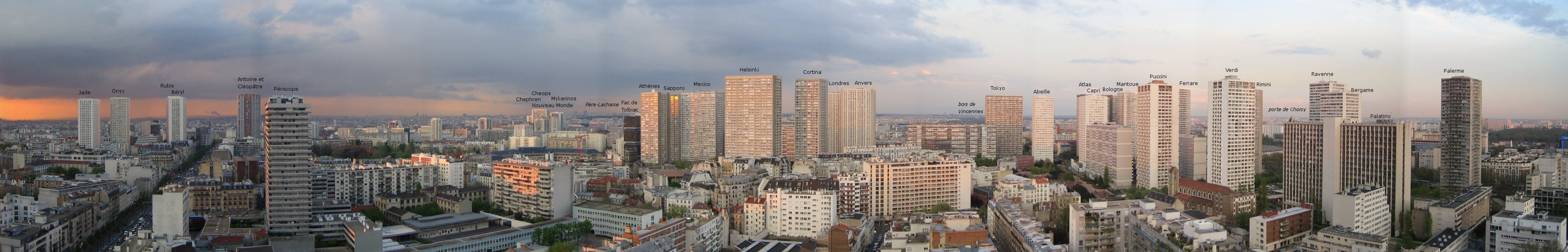
A panoramic view of the towers in Paris's 13th arrondissement

== See also ==
- Chinese community in Paris
- Vietnamese community in Paris
