= Historical quarters of Paris =

Older areas of Paris

Historical quarters of Paris are areas of Paris, France that have retained an older character, usually identifiable by commercial or cultural activity and often named for a neighborhood landmark. These sections often are not referenced on modern-day maps of Paris, crossing current arrondissements.

== The central islands ==
The islands of Paris were once many but over the centuries they have been united or enjoined to the mainland. Today there are three islands near the center of Paris, all in the Seine river: the Île de la Cité, the Île Saint-Louis, and the artificial Île aux Cygnes.

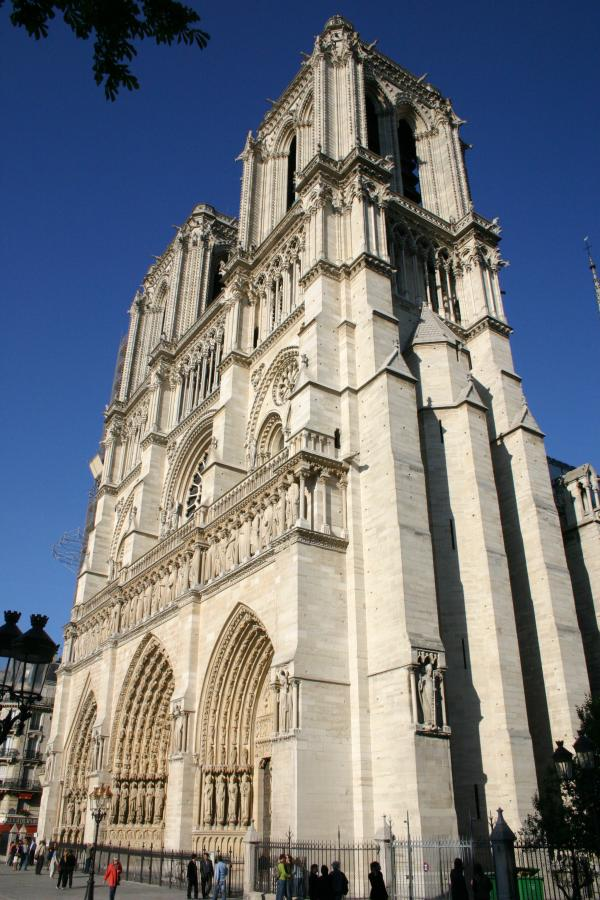
The Notre-Dame de Paris cathedral

=== Île de la Cité ===
The Île de la Cité is the central and historic district of Paris, with a secular and religious history that dates to the 10th century. Its western end has housed a palace since Roman times, and its eastern end has been primarily dedicated to various religious structures, including the famous Notre-Dame cathedral. Until the 1850s, the island was largely residential and commercial, but since has been filled by the city's Prefecture de Police, Palais de Justice, Hôtel-Dieu hospital and Tribunal de commerce de Paris. Only the western and northeastern areas of the island remain residential today, and the latter area preserves some vestiges of its 16th-century Anionic houses.

=== Île Saint-Louis ===
Purely residential, the island was initially used for the grazing of market cattle and the stocking of wood. One of France's earlier examples of urban planning, it was mapped and built from end to end during the 17th-century reigns of Henri IV and Louis XIII. This island has narrow one-way streets and no metro station.

== Rive Droite ==
Rive Droite (English: "Right Bank"), formerly a marshland between two arms of the Seine, remained largely uninhabited until the early 11th century. The population has since grown and has remained Paris' densest area ever since.

=== Châtelet-Les-Halles / Hôtel de Ville ===
"Le Châtelet," a stronghold/gatehouse guarding the northern end of a bridge from the Île de la Cité, was the origin of early Rive Droite growth. The Les Halles quarter surrounds the former Les Halles marketplace, today a shopping mall centre for a commercial district whose boutiques are geared to tourism. Les Halles is a Metro and RER hub for transport, connecting all suburban regions around the capital.

One landmark in the region is the 1976-built Centre Georges Pompidou. Built in a highly colored modern style contrasting with its surrounding architecture, it houses a permanent modern art exposition and has rotating exhibits that keep to a theme of the post-pop art period. It also houses the BPI, one of the city's most significant libraries and places of study.

Just to the east of the Place du Châtelet lies Paris's Hôtel de Ville (City Hall). It stands on the location of a 12th-century "house of columns" belonging to the city's "Prévôt des Marchands" (a city governor of commerce), then a later version built in 1628 whose shell is the same today. Just across the street to the north of rue de Rivoli is the 1870s-built BHV (Bazar de l'Hôtel de Ville) department store.

=== Le Louvre / Palais Royal ===
The Louvre, once Paris' second Royal Palace, is today a museum, garden (Tuileries), and, more recently, a shopping mall and fashion-show centre (Le Carrousel du Louvre). The Palais-Royal just to its north, originally a residence of the Cardinal Richelieu, is a walled garden behind its rue de Rivoli facade, with covered and columned arcades that house boutiques forming what could be considered Paris' first "shopping arcade". This quarter has 17th and 18th century buildings, as well as some of Paris' more grandiose constructions, namely along the avenue de l'Opéra, from the Haussmann era. The massive buildings on the northern side of the rue de Rivoli, with their covered and columned arcades, are a result of Paris' first attempt at reconstruction in a larger scale in the early 1840s, and today house the quarter's most tourist-oriented shops, boutiques and night-clubs.

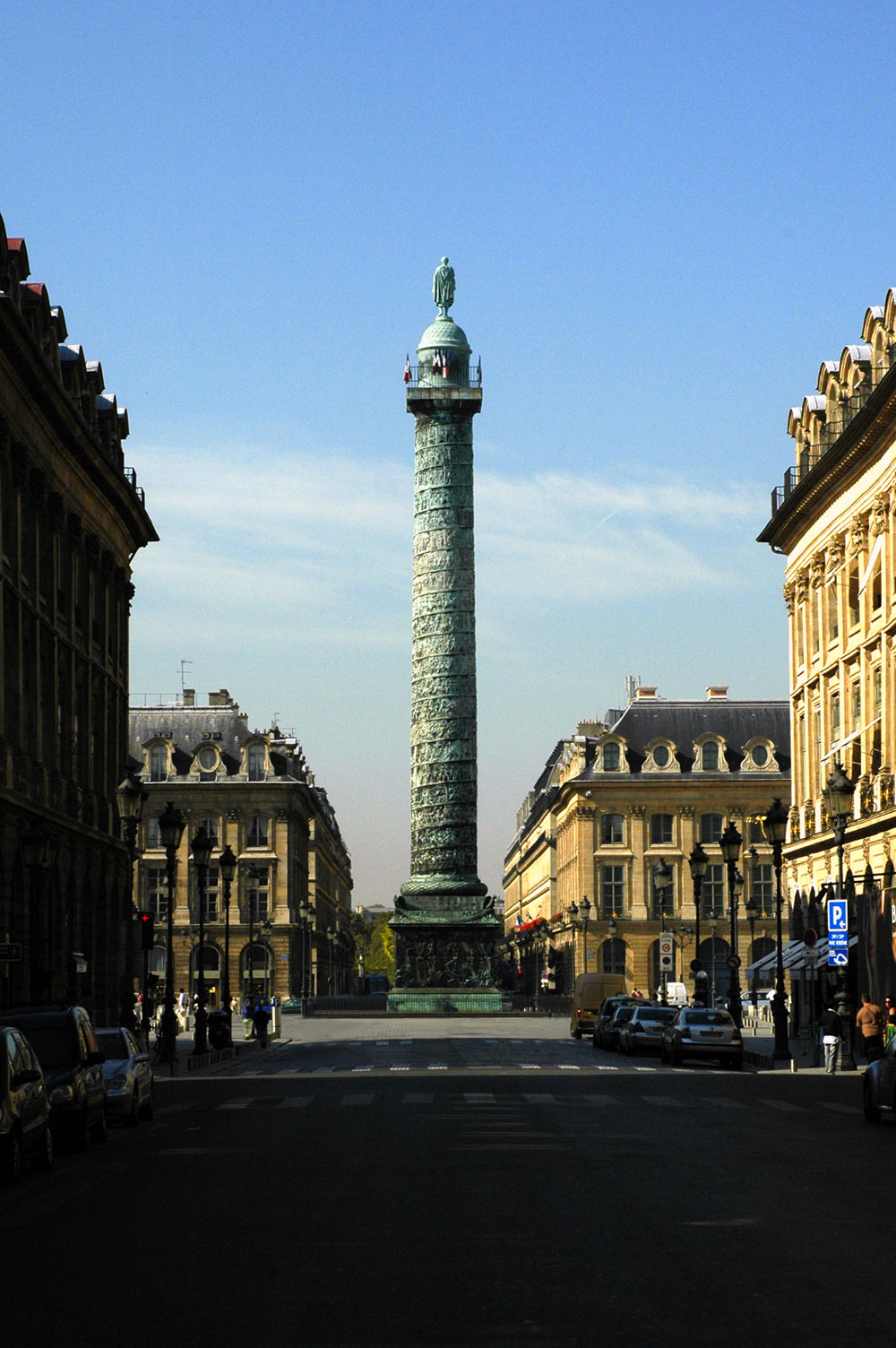
Place Vendôme seen from rue de la Paix

The Arc de Triomphe seen from the Avenue de Friedland

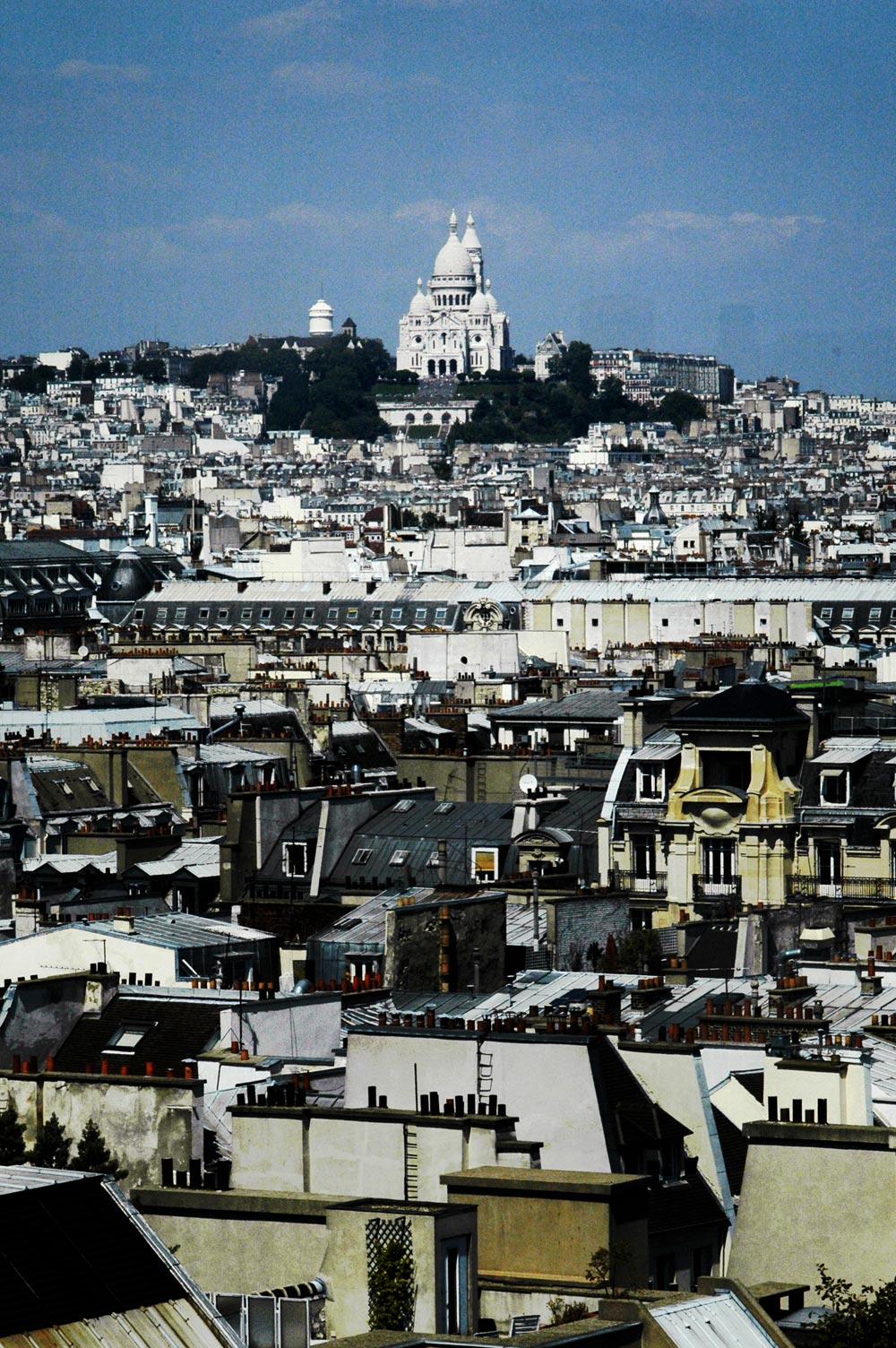
Montmartre as seen from atop the Centre Georges Pompidou

=== Opéra ===
Centred on Paris' Opéra Garnier, completed in 1875, this quarter houses central Paris' largest shopping centres (the Galeries Lafayette and Printemps) and is a banking centre (Crédit Lyonnais, BNP and American Express, etc.).

=== Saint-Honoré / Place Vendôme / Concorde ===
The rue Saint Honoré (and rue du Faubourg Saint-Honoré) is known for its luxury boutiques selling fashion labels of international renown. Place Vendôme, home to the Hôtel Ritz, is the centre of the jewellery trade in Paris. There are also major banks and offices in this area. Place de la Concorde, to the western end of the Louvre's Jardin des Tuileries, are known for fountains, an Egyptian obelisk and a panoramic introduction to the Champs-Élysées that begins at its western extremity.

=== Les Champs-Élysées ===
Les Champs-Élysées features commerce along its entire length, from the rond-point des Champs-Élysées to the Arc de Triomphe. The buildings above the street-side boutiques are for the most part Paris offices or residences for international businesses. The streets behind the Avenue and in the neighbourhood surrounding are filled with Haussmanian buildings that host some residences, but are largely dominated by offices.

=== Montmartre / Bas de Montmartre / Pigalle ===
Culminating at 130 metres, Montmartre is Paris's highest hill and second most-visited tourist area. It formerly was a town of wine growers and gypsum miners centred on a 15th-century monastery. Many of Montmartre's windmills and much of its "old village" charm had already been destroyed when Paris's tourist boom began in the early 20th century, but investors and speculators rebuilt it. Montmartre has some of the best views of the capital.

The boulevards below Montmartre, also called le bas de Montmartre ("lower Montmartre") or more informally Pigalle, were once popular with mid-19th-century Parisians for their cabarets, as at the time they were outside the city of Paris (up until the annexations of 1859) and thus exempt from the octroi (taxes levied on goods for consumption – including drinks – that were imported into the city). The Moulin Rouge is the most prominent remaining example of the once numerous saloons and dance halls that lined the north side of the boulevard. Today this establishment a gaudy mirror of what it once was. The surrounding boulevards, especially to the east of the Moulin Rouge towards Place Pigalle, are home to sex-oriented businesses (sex shops, peep shows, strip clubs). The south of the Pigalle district, in particular around Rue de Douai and Rue Victor Massé, is specialized in the retail of musical instruments and equipment, notably guitars and drums.

=== Gare de l'Est / Gare du Nord ===
This area contains clothing stores and hair salons whose owners are largely of African origin. These stations mark the northernmost limits of Paris' "Sentier" textile industry district.

Rue du Faubourg Saint-Denis, which runs along Gare du Nord, is the domain of Indian shops (clothes, Bollywood videos) and restaurants. A parade in honor of Ganesh is organized every year. These so-called "Indian" immigrants mostly come from Pakistan (in the lower part of the street) or Sri Lanka (in the upper part of the street).

=== Le Marais ===
To the west of the place de la Bastille extends the rue du Faubourg Saint-Antoine, a street running through the centre of the Faubourg Saint-Antoine, once a village of furniture-making artisans. To the north and north-west lies Le Marais with 17th-century buildings. The rue du faubourg Saint-Antoine still has many furniture stores.

Today Le Marais is most known for its square and uniformly-built Place des Vosges. Inaugurated as the "Place Royale" in 1612, much of the land surrounding was built with vast and luxurious hotels by those seeking closer relations to royalty, and many remain today. This area fell out of royal favour when the King's court left for the Louvre then Versailles, and was in a state of almost abandon by the 19th century. It became a largely Jewish quarter around then, and has remained so. It is also the heart of gay Paris, with many gay cafés, bars, and clubs.

== Rive Gauche ==
Paris' Rive Gauche was its centre from its first to 11th centuries, but little evidence remains of this today. Solidly built from Roman times, its crumbling constructions served as a quarry for Rive Droite constructions when its population moved to Paris' northern shores. Today, the rive Gauche is mostly residential.

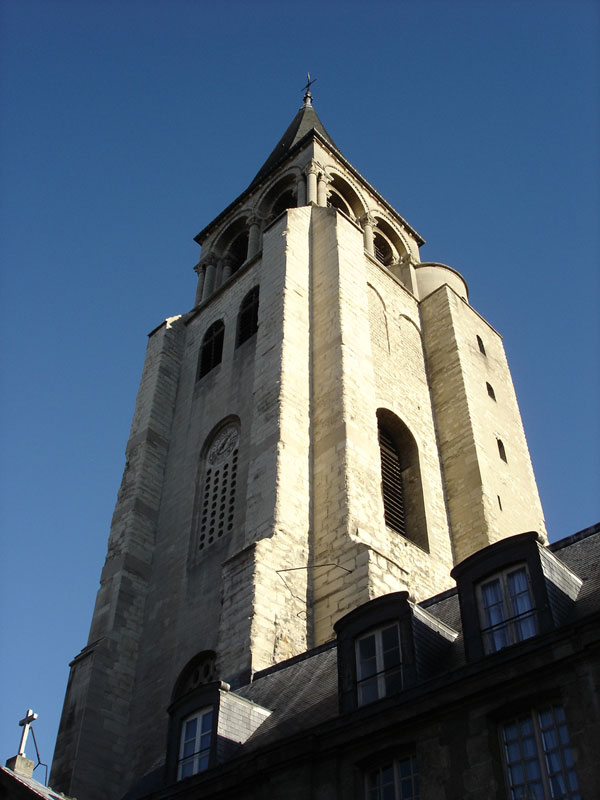
Saint-Germain-des-Prés abbey-church

=== Saint-Germain-des-Prés / Faubourg Saint-Germain ===
This central Rive-Gauche quarter is named for its 7th century abbey of which only a church is still standing. Its commercial growth began upon the 1886 completion of its Boulevard Saint-Germain and the opening of its cafés and bistros, namely its "Café de Flore" and "Deux Magots" terraces. Its fame came with the 1950s post-WW II student "culture emancipation" movement that had its source in the nearby University. Many jazz clubs appeared here during those times, and a few still remain today.

Located near the École des Beaux-Arts, this quarter is known for its artistry in general, and has many galleries along its rue Bonaparte and rue de Seine. In all, Saint-Germain-des-Prés is an upper-class residential district, with quality clothing and gastronomical street-side commerce.

=== Odéon / Saint-Michel ===
Odéon is named for the 18th-century theatre standing between the Boulevard Saint-Germain and the Jardin du Luxembourg, but today it is best known for its cinemas and cafés.

The land to the south of the Seine River to the east of the Boulevard Saint-Michel, around its Sorbonne University, has been a centre of student activity since the early 12th century. The surrounding neighbourhood is filled with student-oriented commercial establishments such as bookstores, stationery stores and game shops.

The land to the north of the Boulevard Saint-Germain, to the east of the Boulevard Saint-Michel, is one of the Rive Gauche's few tourist oases. Although its narrow streets are charming, as they have remained unchanged from medieval times, they are filled with souvenir shops and tourist restaurants.

=== Invalides / École Militaire / Eiffel Tower / Quai d'Orsay ===
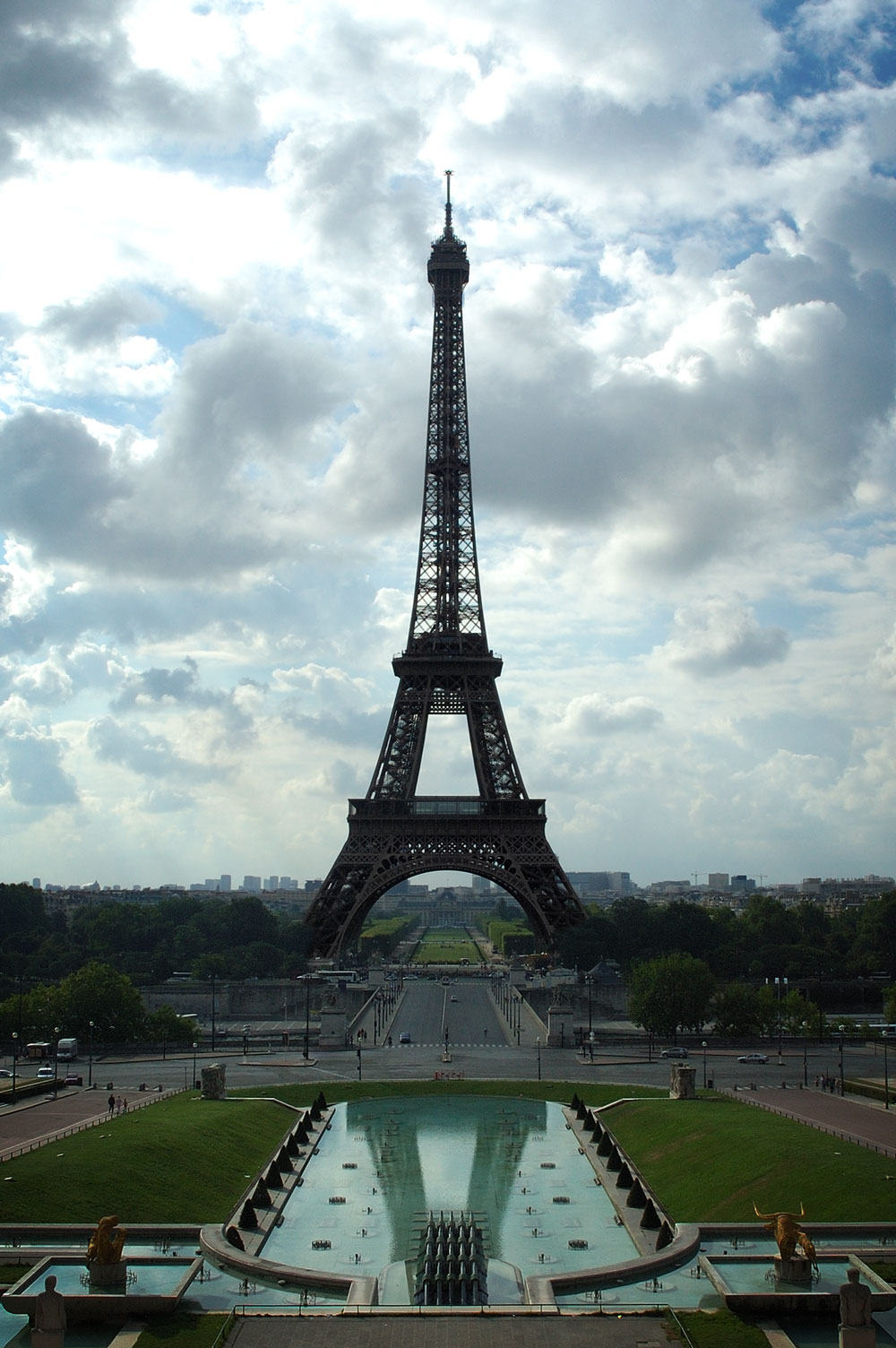
La Tour Eiffel (Eiffel Tower) seen from l'Esplanade du Trocadéro

Paris' 17th-century Hôtel des Invalides and 18th-century École Militaire were built where they were in an effort to force the Rive Gauche's growth westward, to match that to its opposing Rive Droite. Les Invalides, a former military hospital and today a retirement home for former soldiers, became a tourist attraction after the Emperor Napoleon's ashes were interred there in 1840, and a military museum from 1872 (Artillery).

Just to the west from there lies the École Militaire, built from 1751. It is to the river end of its former parade ground that lies Paris' foremost tourist attraction. The Eiffel Tower, built by Gustave Alexandre Eiffel for the 1889 Universal Exposition, averages around 6 million visitors a year.

Further east along the bank of the Seine lies the former Paris-à-Orléans train station built for the 1900 Universal Exposition. Closed in 1939, it has been since renovated into a museum of 19th-century art, the Musée d'Orsay, open to the public since December 1986.

=== Montparnasse / Denfert-Rochereau ===
This quarter owes its artistic reputation to its Montparnasse cemetery. Open from 1824, it attracted the ateliers of sculptors and engravers to the still-inbuilt land nearby, and these in turn drew painters and other artists looking for calmer climes than the saturated and expensive Rive Droite. Many of these artists met in the boulevard Montparnasse's cafés and bistros, one of these being the Belle Époque "La Coupole". This aspect of Montparnasse's culture has faded since the second world war, but many of its artist atelier-residence "Cités" are there to see.

The Gare Montparnasse, since its beginning as a railway connection to Versailles in 1840, has since grown into the Rive Gauche's commuter hub connection to destinations in southern France. The neighbourhood around it is a business quarter that houses Paris' tallest building, the Tour Montparnasse.

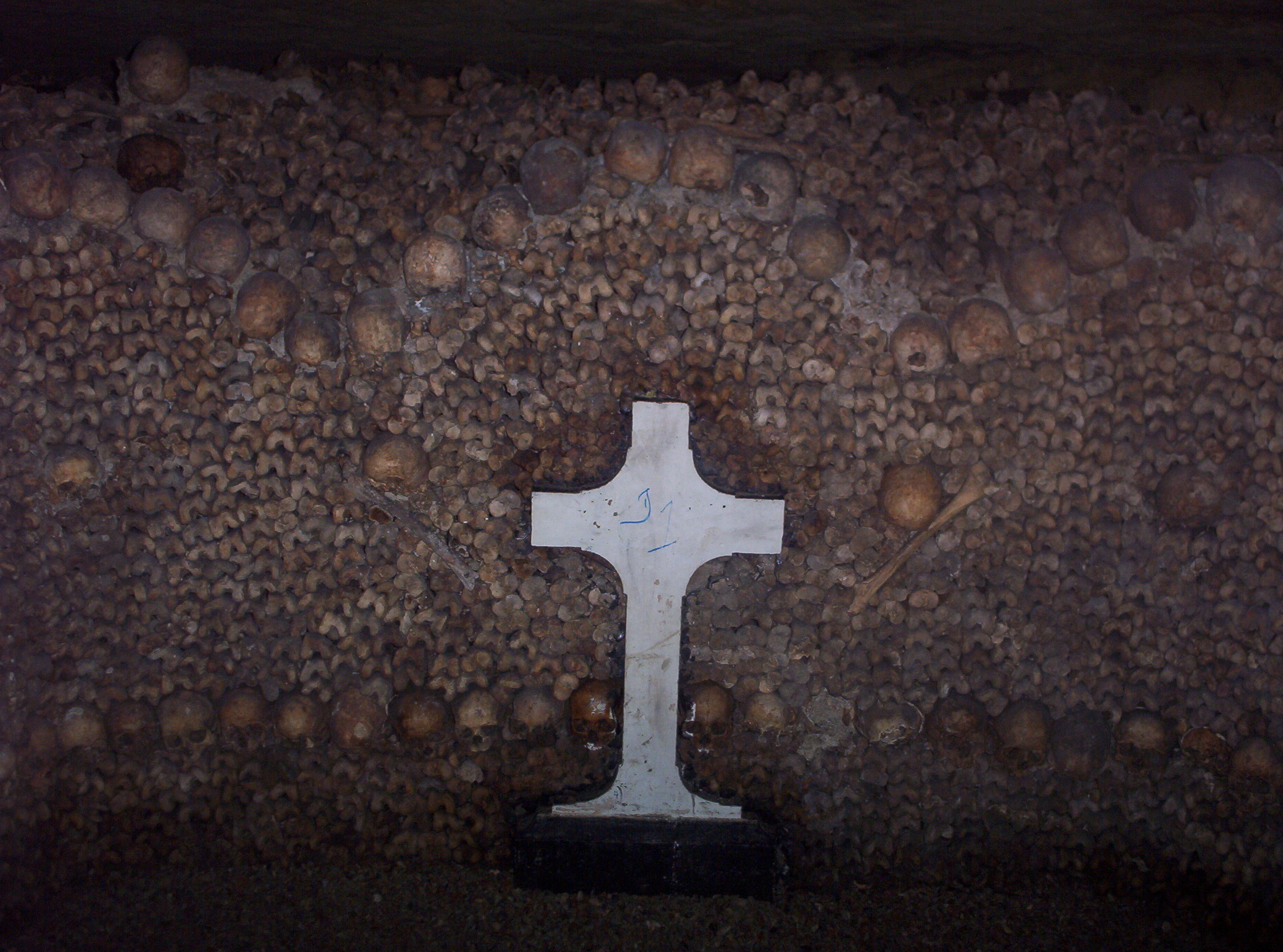
The Catacombs of Paris

To the south-east of the boulevard Montparnasse, to the bottom of the northward-running Avenue Denfert-Rochereau at the square of the same name, is one of Paris' few-remaining pre-1860s "prolype" gateways. The westernmost of these twin buildings holds the Catacombs of Paris. Formerly stone mines, abandoned when Paris annexed the land over them in 1860, the underground hallways became a new sepulture for the contents of Paris' overflowing and unhygienic parish cemeteries. At its origin a jumbled bone depository, it was renovated in the early 19th century into uniform rooms and hallways of neatly (and even artistically) arranged skulls and tibias, and opened to the public for paid visits from 1868.

=== Front de Seine / Beaugrenelle ===
The Front de Seine district located along the river Seine in the 15th arrondissement right at the South of the Eiffel Tower is the result of an urban planning project from the 1970s. It includes about 20 towers reaching nearly 100 m of height built around an elevated esplanade. That esplanade is paved with frescos. It is host to The Hôtel Novotel Paris-Tour Eiffel (formerly known as Hôtel Nikkō), with its red-encircled windows, the Tour Totem consisting of a stack of several glassed-blocks and a newly redesigned shopping mall, the Centre commercial Beaugrenelle.

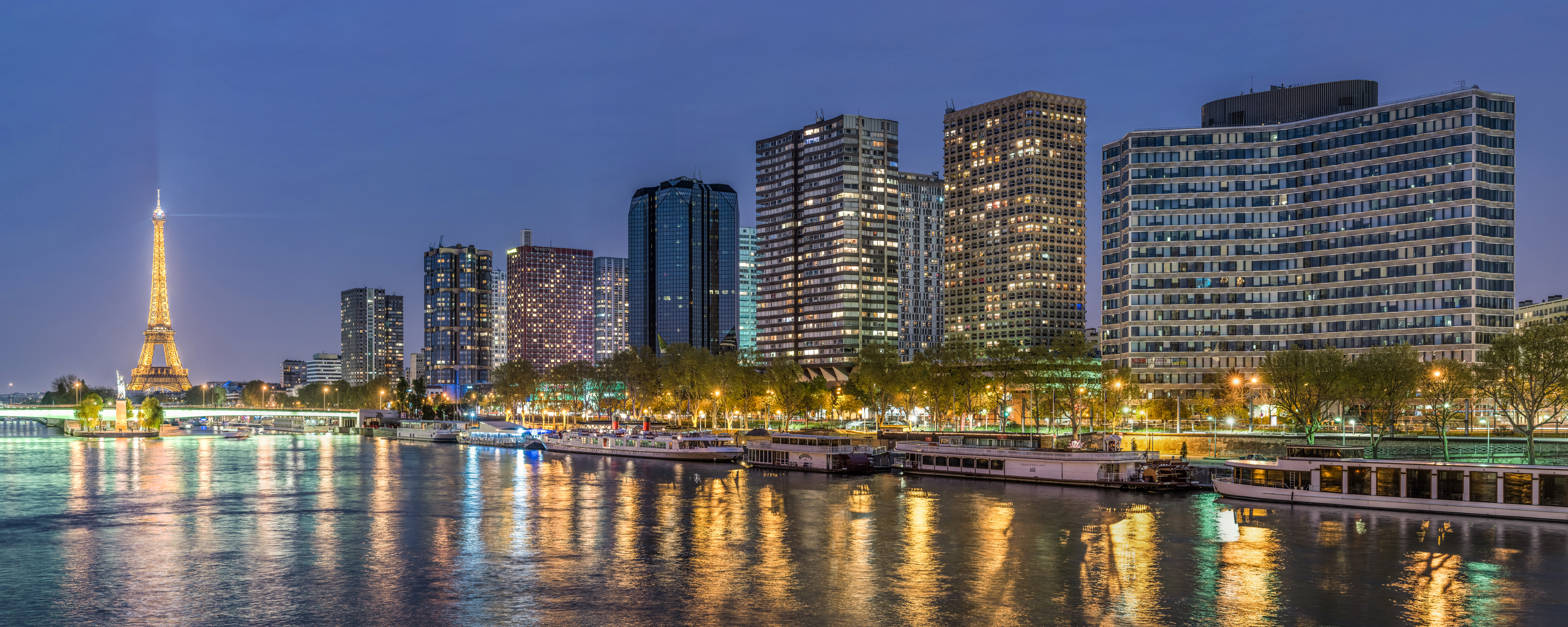
Front de Seine as seen from the Pont Mirabeau

=== Place d'Italie / Olympiades / Chinatown ===
During the 1960s, public authorities designed an urban renewal plan inspired from Le Corbusier's theories that tended to erase many peripheral quarters of Paris and build pedestrian quarters with high rise buildings, connected by urban highways. The plan was partially completed in the Beaugrenelle quarter (15th district) and, through the Italie 13 project, in the 13th district. More than twenty-five 100-meter-high residential buildings were built south of Place d'Italie, notably Les Olympiades. The completion of these towers in the mid-1970s coincided with the arrival of many refugees from Cambodia and Vietnam, so that the triangle between the Avenue d'Ivry, the Avenue de Choisy and the boulevard Masséna quickly became a vibrant and colorful 'Chinatown' with dozens of Asian restaurants, shops, hairdressers, supermarkets, and a New Year parade. Other, less well-known Asian quarters exist for example in the 3rd district (rue au Maire) and Belleville.

== Key suburbs ==
=== La Défense business district ===
As one of the largest business districts in the world, Paris La Défense is a major destination for business travel in Europe.

Characteristics:

- 3,000,000 m² (32.3 million sq. ft) of offices
- Europe's largest shopping centre with nearly 3,000 hotel rooms, 600 shops and services, and over 100 restaurants
- daily influx of 160,000 office staff with 2 million tourist visits annually
- CNIT congress centre, the largest self-supporting vault in the world, 43,000 m² (463,000 sq ft), including 29,000 m² (312,000 sq ft) of modular spaces, 36 meetings rooms and 4 halls
- La Défense stands on Paris's historic East-West axis (L'Axe historique).

In December 2005 the new plan for the district of La Défense was presented. The project is articulated around a tall skyscraper (more than 400 m/1,300 ft high), a new symbol for Paris which would be the tallest skyscraper in Europe if it is built.

The project to build the Grande Arche was initiated by the French president François Mitterrand, who wanted a 20th-century version of the Arc de Triomphe. The design of the Danish architect Otto van Spreckelsen looks more like a cube-shaped building than a triumphal arch. It is a 110-meter-tall white building with the middle part left open. The sides of the cube contain offices. A lift to the top of the Grande Arche provides views of Paris.

== See also ==
- Landmarks in Paris
- List of tourist attractions in Paris
- Arrondissements of Paris
