= Italie 13 =

Urbanism project in Paris, France

Coordinates: 48°49′42″N 2°21′19″E

The Masséna district

Italie 13 (or Italie XIII) is the name of a large urbanism project in Paris which started in the 1960s and was interrupted in the 1970s. Its purpose was to profoundly modify the structure of some areas of the 13th arrondissement, mainly around the Avenue d'Italie which inspired its name. The partially completed project led to the creation of numerous towers in the south of the arrondissement, notably Les Olympiades.

== Origins of the project ==
Towers of the Olympiades behind the last remaining structure of Panhard factories.

The Italie 13 project was one of the answers proposed by urbanists to the insalubrity of some areas of the city, mainly the 13th arrondissement which was generally considered to be "badly built." Raymond Lopez, the advising architect at the Paris city hall, and his assistant Michel Holley, considered this renovation to be an opportunity to completely reorganize those areas, in the spirit of the Athens charter and Le Corbusier. This meant that new construction should be tall in order to liberate more space at the ground level and to bring a better luminosity to apartments, and separating heavily traveled roads from smaller local roads and pedestrian areas. Other principles from Le Corbusier, such as surrounding towers with parks were, however, put aside.

The guiding plan of urbanism ("Plan d'urbanisme directeur") written in 1959 and applied in 1961, concisely summarizes that new conception of the city: "urban layout should not be defined anymore by streets, but actually by built-up structures, which should themselves be guided by functional considerations". The Olympiades district is a perfect illustration of this program.

Thanks to strong political support following the creation of the Fifth Republic in 1958, the Italie 13 project began quickly. The city council approved it in 1966 and charged the private sector with completing it. The project operated on a territory of 87 hectares between Place d'Italie, avenue de Choisy and Paris's outlying boulevards. Its ambition was to build 16,400 accommodations, and 150,000 m² of commercial and business space. It also included the construction of new schools and gardens.

Towers were supposed to be approximately the same height, about 30 floors. Holley felt that towers should respect the principle of height unity according to Parisian traditions.

== Results ==
The main buildings resulting from Italie 13 are found in three main areas, with scattered isolated buildings.

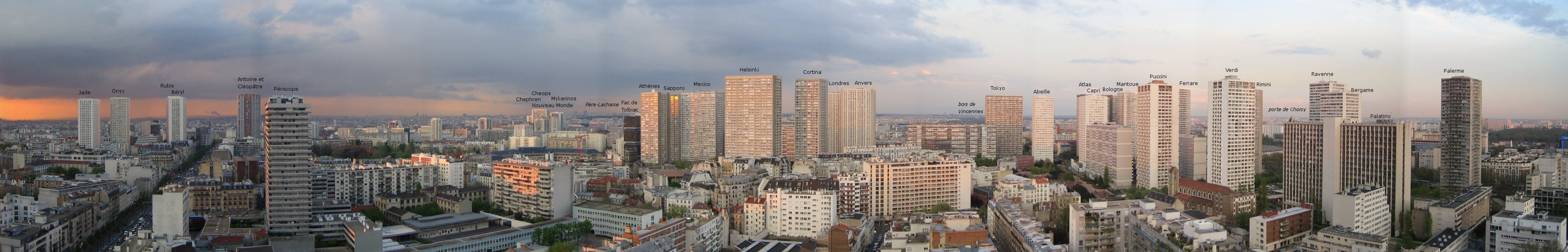
View on the three main areas of towers from the Tour Super-Italie.

=== Les Olympiades ===
The Olympiades project, directly managed by Michel Holley from 1969 to 1974, is the only project (along with the Front de Seine district (located in the 15th arrondissement)) to fully respect the objectives of the guiding plan of urbanism:

- towers and groundscrapers are displayed along an approximate North-South axis independently of street layout.
- some streets, exclusively dedicated to functional use, are invisible as they are built under the huge elevated esplanade in the middle of the district.
- The esplanade is exclusively dedicated to the pedestrians, while the surrounding avenues concentrate all the car traffic. Shops are built on the esplanade, along with the main entrances of the towers.

Towers of the district are named after cities which had hosted the Olympic Games: Athènes (Athens), Sapporo, Helsinki, Tokyo and others.

Nowadays, the district, costly to maintain, is part of a new renovation project in the context of a grand projet de renouvellement urbain (large project of urban renewal).

=== Nearby Place d'Italie ===
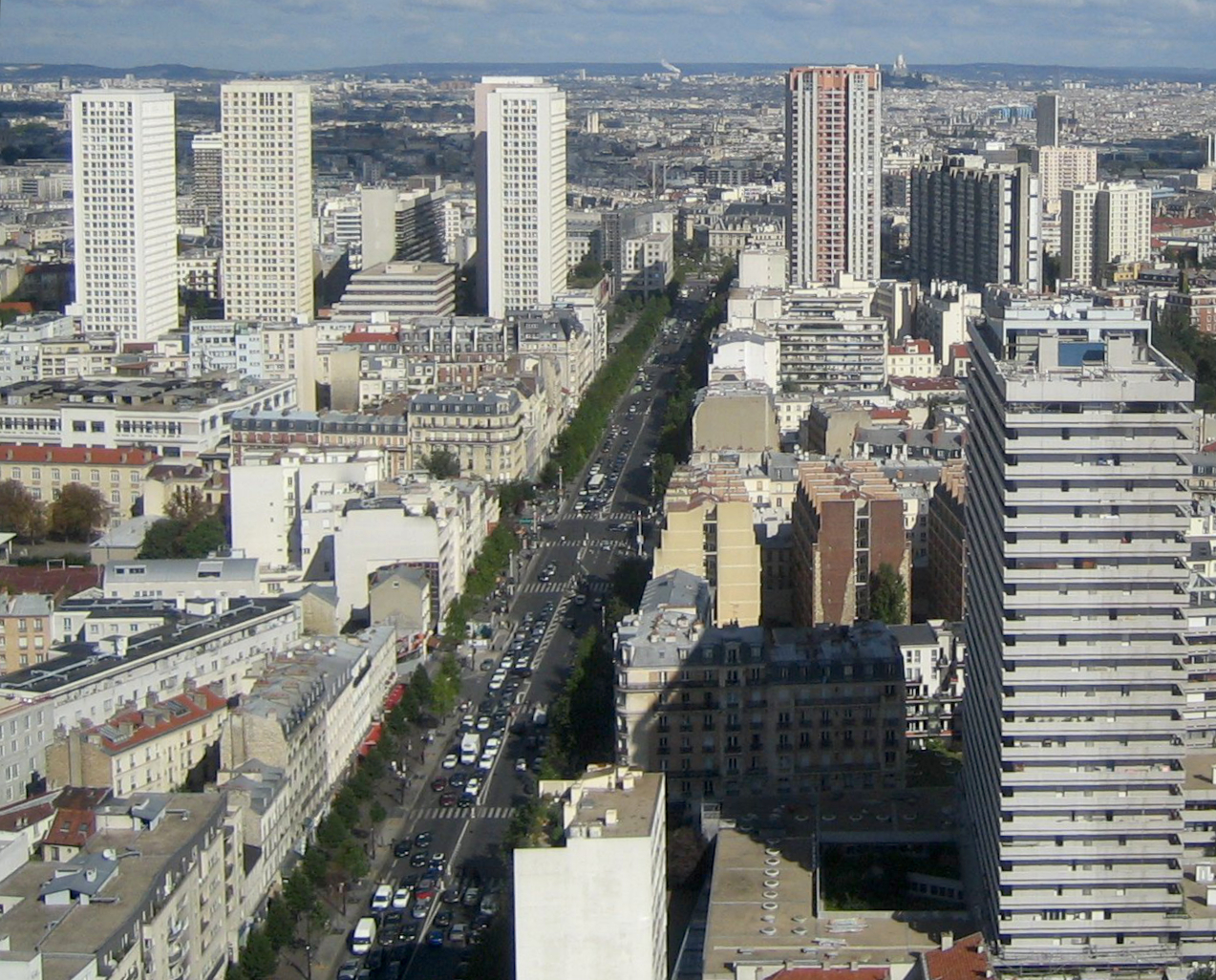
From right to left: le Périscope (M. Novarina), Antoine et Cléopâtre (M. Holley) and the four towers of the centre Galaxie.

The Avenue d'Italie was slated to be enlarged to the dimensions of the Champs-Elysées and become an expressway. Pedestrians and local traffic were supposed to cross the avenue with bridges and tunnels. This part of the project has been abandoned.

Near Place d'Italie, Michel Holley has drawn the tower Antoine et Cléopâtre, one of the few not to be strictly parallelepiped-shaped.

On the other side of the avenue, four towers and one groundscraper named after precious or semi-precious stones (Onyx, Beryl, Jade, Ruby) have been erected around a private garden built on the roof of the Italie 2 shopping mall (itself formerly known as Galaxie). An esplanade was supposed to cover the Avenue d'Italie, something which has finally been abandoned. It is one of the rare spots where the Avenue d'Italie has been enlarged to 70 meters, as planned by the Italie 13 project.

The most ambitious part of the project was the tour Apogée: similar in height to the Tour Montparnasse, it was supposed to be the landmark indicating the entrance of the district. Proposed with different design by Michel Holley during the 1970s, its height successively decreased before finally the cancellation of its construction. In 1980, the French government had to pay 470 million francs to the promoter as compensation for this cancellation.

=== The Masséna district ===
This district is built on the former location of Panhard factories between Porte d'Ivry and the rue Gandon. It encompasses from East to West:

- Villa d'Este, where the concentration of towers is undoubtedly the highest inside the city of Paris.
- The shopping mall of Masséna 13.
- The district of the Porte de Choisy.

Towers in that district are directly displayed at the street level and as such are better integrated in the Paris urban layout. They are named after Italian cities or composers: Puccini, Palerme, Rimini, among others.

=== Other constructions ===
There are also some isolated buildings and projects:

- near Porte d'Italie: the Tour Super-Italie, the only cylindrical tower in the district, and the tour Chambord built on the boulevard Kellermann.
- On the boulevard Vincent-Auriol: several scattered highrise buildings including the three towers of Cheops, Chephren and Mykerinos, thus named because their shape is slightly pyramidal, and one of the most original towers in Paris:
- The Tour du Nouveau-Monde, whose entire exterior is decorated with bas-reliefs.

== The end of Italie 13 and the return to a more traditional conception of the city ==
As the towers were being successively erected, public criticism grew increasingly harsh, a view which was later shared by professionals and politicians. In 1974, the new French president Valéry Giscard d'Estaing, decided to stop the Italie 13 project.

The brutalist design of the towers, formerly seen as revolutionary progress, failed, for some, to promote a positive image of the 13th arrondissement. This is especially true since, being built on a hill, they are more visible than other projects such as the Front de Seine towers. The bland aspect of those buildings has massively damaged the image of towers, in general, among Parisians. Inhabitants of the towers are themselves more ambivalent. Their judgement depends widely on the building they live in. Indeed, while the exterior aspect of those towers is very similar, their layouts, amenities and general standing vary enormously from one to another.

Moreover, the operating costs of these buildings are very expensive compared to more traditional Hausmanian buildings. They were designed with affluent buyers in mind, but at this time, affluent buyers thought that these were too far from the west of Paris where they worked. Most of them failed to sell out and were soon filled with Asian refugees who found available housing. Sometimes, up to 4 families crowded some apartment space, and for many of them paying the operating costs and rent was a problem. In the meantime, Parisians started to leave the city center and its apartments to buy individual houses in the suburbs, leaving some towers in dire conditions.

Nevertheless, the Olympiades esplanade has maintained a rather important business and commercial role, something which is not true in other projects in Paris and its suburbs. The arrival of the Asian community at the end of the 1970s has brought an important and growing vitality to this area.

In recent years, the area is undergoing (like most of Paris city center) quick gentrification. Most towers have undergone renovation works, and are now up to the latest security norms, urban renewal is taking place below the towers at street level with help from the municipality. (Works on Olympiades and Place de Vénétie is underway, Villa d'Este should follow soon). As a result, real estate prices in this particular neighborhood is up steadily even if it is still a cheap neighborhood compared to other places in Paris. The high quality of the buildings which were created for affluent people means that flats are comfortable, have a nice unobstructed view and a lot of light (which is a rare luxury in Paris). As a result, some more affluent people are starting to consider again this habitat.

Because of the critical reception of this project, urbanism in France, especially in the city of Paris, has followed a much more modest direction. The Paris Rive Gauche project, located a few hundred meters from the Olympiades, is the only large-scale urbanism project inside the city of Paris to be built since Italie 13. However, the dense nature and lack of space in the highly built-up city may also play a role. The Paris Rive Gauche project is an example of more traditional urbanism based on the alignment of mid-rise buildings in concert with the existing street layout. While urbanism of the 1960s and 1970s was based on the idea of breaking with the past, today's urbanism is based on the idea of promoting Paris' heritage. This philosophy is less common in Paris's inner suburbs, where large-scale projects, mostly business developments, have multiplied since the 1990s.

== See also ==
- Les Olympiades
- Front de Seine
- La Défense
- List of tallest buildings and structures in Paris

== Bibliography ==
- (in French) Paris contemporain, Simon Texier, Parigramme (2005)
- (in French) Les Olympiades (Insecula)
