= List of tourist attractions in Paris =

Height comparison of some Paris landmarks

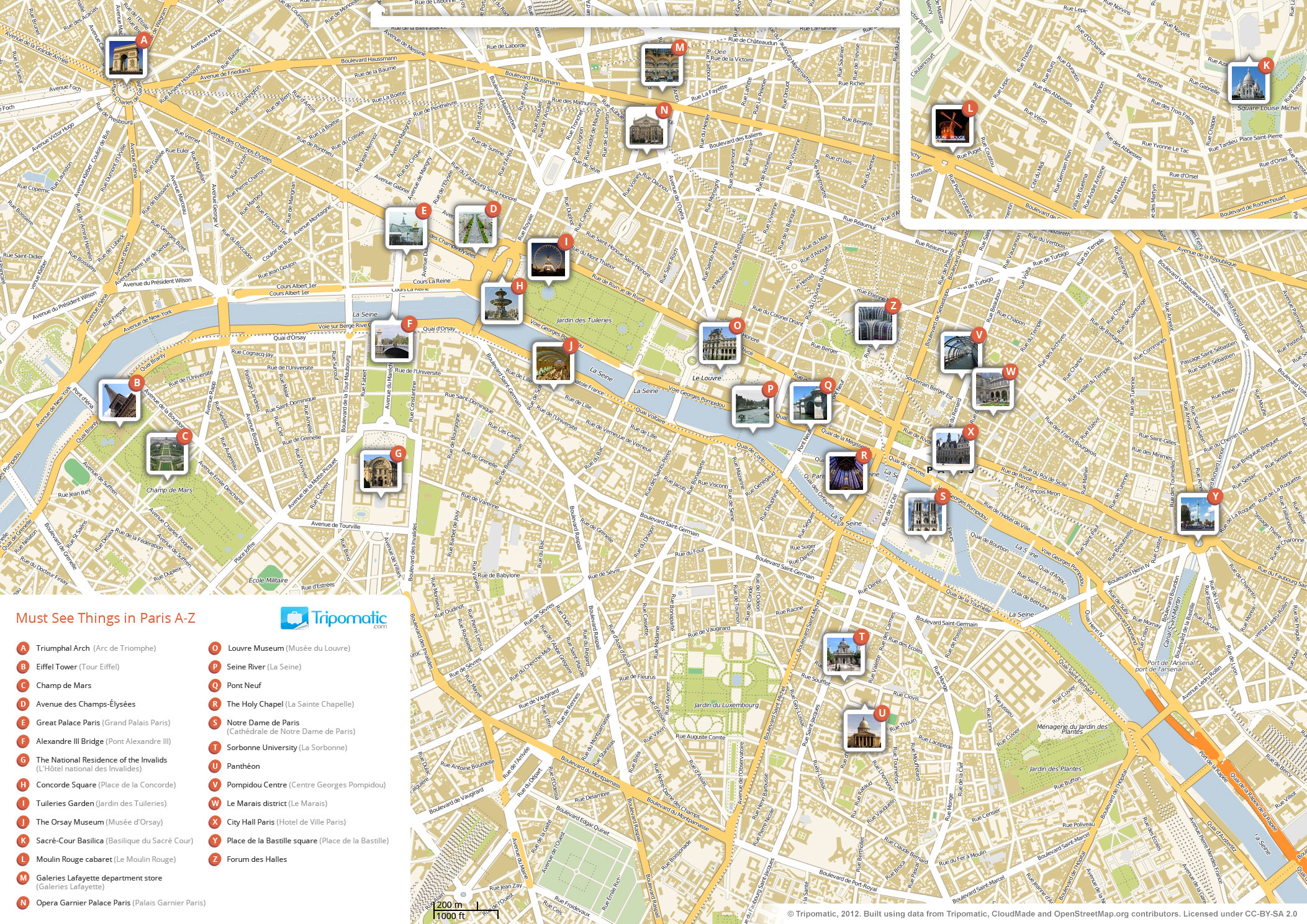
Printable tourist map showing the main attractions of Paris

Paris, the capital of France, has an annual 30 million foreign visitors, and so is one of the most visited cities in the world. Paris's sights include monuments and architecture, such as its Arc de Triomphe, Eiffel Tower and neo-classic Haussmannian boulevards and buildings as well as museums, operas and concert halls. There are also more modern attractions such as its suburban Disneyland Paris.

== Within the City of Paris ==
=== Museums ===
- Centre Georges-Pompidou - 20th-century modern art museum, hosting the Paris Museum of Modern Art
- Cité des Sciences et de l'Industrie - a hands-on science museum that attracts over two million visitors yearly
- The Louvre - one of the world's largest museums and a historic monument
- Musée des Arts et Métiers - Museum of Arts and Crafts that houses the collection of the Conservatoire National des Arts et Métiers (National Conservatory of Arts and Industry), which was founded in 1794 as a repository for the preservation of scientific instruments and inventions
- Musée d'Orsay - 19th-century paintings, one of the largest Impressionist exhibits, housed in a former rail station
- Musée de l'Orangerie - Impressionist and Post-Impressionist paintings, the permanent home of eight large Water Lilies murals by Claude Monet
- Musée Marmottan Monet - dedicated to Claude Monet, includes over 300 paintings including Monet's Impression, Sunrise
- Muséum national d'histoire naturelle - National Museum of Natural History
- Musée Picasso - dedicated to the works of Pablo Picasso
- Musée Rodin - houses the works of sculptors Auguste Rodin and Camille Claudel
- Parc de la Villette - hosting the Cité des Sciences et de l'Industrie, a science museum, and the Cité de la Musique, which houses various musical institutes, a museum, and a concert hall

=== Monuments ===
- The Arc de Triomphe - monument at the center of the Place de l'Étoile, commemorating the victories of France and honoring those who died in battle
- The Conciergerie - located on the Île de la Cité; a medieval building which was formerly used as a prison where some prominent members of the ancien régime stayed before their death during the French Revolution
- The Eiffel Tower - a construction of Gustave Eiffel for the 1889 Universal Exposition
- The Grand Palais - a large glass exhibition hall built for the 1900 Paris Exhibition
- Les Invalides - complex containing museums and monuments relating to the military history of France
- The Palais Garnier - Paris's central opera house, built in the later Second Empire period
- The Panthéon - church and tomb of a number of France's most famed men and women
- Place des Vosges - square in the Marais districte
- Place Vendôme

=== Churches ===
- Basilica of the Sacré Cœur - located in the district of Montmartre
- The Montmartre Cemetery - located in the district of Montmartre
- Notre-Dame de Paris Cathedral - Paris's 12th-century ecclesiastical centrepiece on the Île de la Cité
- The Père Lachaise Cemetery - largest cemetery in Paris.
- Sainte-Chapelle - a 13th-century Gothic palace chapel, also located on the Île de la Cité
- Church of St Eustache - a 16th-century Gothic church in the district of Les Halles
- La Madeleine - a 19th-century church designed as a Roman temple
- Grand Mosque of Paris - a large mosque, the first ever built in Metropolitan France

=== Shopping ===
- Galerie Vivienne, 19th-century glass-roofed shopping arcade in the 2nd arrondissement
- Galeries Lafayette, historic department store with a famous stained-glass dome
- Le Bon Marché, department store on the Left Bank, founded in 1838
- Passage des Panoramas, 19th-century glass-roofed shopping arcade, the oldest covered passage in Paris
- Printemps, department store on Boulevard Haussmann
- Saint-Ouen flea market, in Saint-Ouen-sur-Seine just north of the city, one of the largest antiques markets in the world

=== Modern and contemporary architecture of the 20th and 21st century ===
- Arab World Institute (1987) Jean Nouvel, 5th arrondissement of Paris
- Bercy Arena, équipe Andrault-Parat, Jean Prouvé, Guvan (1984), 12th arrondissement of Paris.
- Cité internationale universitaire de Paris, Pavillon Suisse (1930) and Maison du Brésil (1954), Le Corbusier and Lúcio Costa for the latter
- Front de Seine (1970s) and Centre commercial Beaugrenelle, Valode et Pistre (2013), 15th arrondissement of Paris
- Minister of the Economy, Finances and Industry (1989), 12th arrondissement of Paris.
- Musée Mendjisky, Robert Mallet-Stevens, (1932) 15th arrondissement of Paris
- Opéra Bastille, Carlos Ott (1989), 11th arrondissement of Paris
- Palais de Chaillot (1937), Jacques Carlu, Louis-Hippolyte Boileau and Léon Azéma, 16th arrondissement of Paris
- Palais de la Porte Dorée (1931), Albert Laprade, 12th arrondissement of Paris
- Palais de Tokyo (1937), architects: Jean-Claude Dondel, André Aubert, Paul Viard et Marcel Dastugue, low reliefs: Alfred Janniot, statue La France: Antoine Bourdelle, 16th arrondissement of Paris
- Palais d'Iéna (1937), Auguste Perret, 16th arrondissement of Paris
- Palais de Chaillot (1937), Jacques Carlu, Louis-Hippolyte Boileau and Léon Azéma, 16th arrondissement of Paris (1927), Jacques Marcel Auburtin, André Granet and Jean-Baptiste Mathon, 8th arrondissement of Paris
- Salle Pleyel (1927), Jacques Marcel Auburtin, André Granet and Jean-Baptiste Mathon, 8th arrondissement of Paris
- La Samaritaine, building facing the river (1928?), Frantz Jourdain and Henri Sauvage, 1st arrondissement of Paris
- Site of the French communist party, Oscar Niemeyer (1965–1980), 19th arrondissement of Paris
- Théâtre des Champs-Élysées (1913), Auguste Perret, 8th arrondissement of Paris
- Tour Montparnasse, architects Jean Saubot, Eugène Beaudouin, Urbain Cassan and Louis de Hoÿm de Marien (1973), 15th arrondissement of Paris
- World Heritage Centre (Unesco) (1958) architects: French Bernard Zehrfuss, Américan Marcel Breuer, and Italian Pier Luigi Nervi. Their plans were validated by an international committee of five architects: Lucio Costa (Brasil), Walter Gropius (United States), Le Corbusier (France), Sven Markelius (Sweden) and Ernesto Nathan Rogers (Italy), in collaboration with Eero Saarinen (Finland). 7th arrondissement of Paris
- Centre national d'art et de culture Georges-Pompidou, Renzo Piano, Richard Rogers, Gianfranco Franchini (1977), 1st arrondissement of Paris
- Les Echelles du Baroque, Ricardo Bofill (1985), 14th arrondissement of Paris
- La Géode, architects Adrien Fainsilber and Gérard Chamayou (1985), 19th arrondissement of Paris
- Église Notre-Dame-de-l'Arche-d'Alliance, Architecture-Studio (1986), 15th arrondissement of Paris
- Louvre Pyramid, Ieoh Ming Pei (1989), 1st arrondissement of Paris
- La Défense, Paris business district, Grande Arche, Johan Otto von Spreckelsen and Erik Reitzel (1989)
- Parc André-Citroën, landscaping: Gilles Clément, Allain Provost, architects Patrick Berger, Jean-François Jodry and Jean-Paul Viguier, (1992), 15th arrondissement of Paris
- Canal+ former site (1992), Richard Meier, 15th arrondissement of Paris
- Outside shell Ministère de la Culture (France), 1st arrondissement of Paris
- Cinémathèque française (1993), Frank Gehry, 12th arrondissement of Paris.
- Fondation Cartier pour l'art contemporain, Jean Nouvel (1994), 14th arrondissement of Paris
- Bibliothèque nationale de France, Dominique Perrault (1995), 13th arrondissement of Paris
- Musée du quai Branly, Jean Nouvel (2006), 7th arrondissement of Paris
- Cité de la mode et du design, Jakob + Macfarlane (2008), 13th arrondissement of Paris
- Louis Vuitton Foundation, Frank Gehry (2014), 16th arrondissement of Paris
- Philharmonie de Paris, Jean Nouvel (2015), 19th arrondissement of Paris

=== Others ===
- Montmartre - an old district of Paris on a hill containing the Bateau-Lavoir, the Basilica of the Sacré Cœur, the Place du Tertre, the Musée de Montmartre, and other sites.
- The Sorbonne - one of the universities of Paris (Paris IV), the centre of Paris's Latin Quarter.
- Statue of Liberty replicas - A smaller version of Frédéric Auguste Bartholdi's Liberty Enlightening the World, the New York City harbor statue which France gave to the United States in 1886, located on the Île aux Cygnes on the Seine in the Front de Seine district.
- Another smaller version is in the Luxembourg Garden.
- Flame of Liberty - replica of the flame held by the Statue of Liberty
- Pasteur Institute and museum

== In the Paris region ==
=== Monuments ===
- Palace of Versailles - the famous former palace of French kings
- Saint Denis Basilica - the burial site of the French kings
- Château de Fontainebleau - built by Francis I of France, it is one of the largest of the French royal châteaux
- Château de Vaux-le-Vicomte
- Château de Vincennes (Vincennes Castle) - a large medieval castle nearby the Bois de Vincennes (Vincennes Wood)
- Château Villette - a château built in the 18th century
- Parc de Sceaux - a 17th-century park located near the Château de Sceaux (Sceaux Castle).
- La Défense - The largest business district in Europe.
- Cathédrale Saint-Maclou de Pontoise - Roman Catholic cathedral located in the town of Pontoise, on the outskirts of Paris.

=== Entertainment ===
- Disneyland Paris - the largest theme park in Europe
- Parc Astérix - one of many of Paris' theme parks
- Stade de France - the 80,000 seater stadium in which France won the 1998 edition of the FIFA World Cup

=== Museum ===
- Musée Louis Braille

== See also ==
- Landmarks in Paris
- Historical quarters of Paris
- List of Domes in France
- List of museums in Paris
- List of tourist attractions worldwide
