= Olympiades =

Olympiades or Les Olympiades may refer to:

- Les Olympiades, a district in Paris's 13th arrondissement
  - Olympiades station, a Paris Metro Line 14 station in the area
- Paris, 13th District (known in French as Les Olympiades), a 2021 film

== See also ==
- Olympiad
