= Tour Super-Italie =

Residential skyscraper in Paris, France

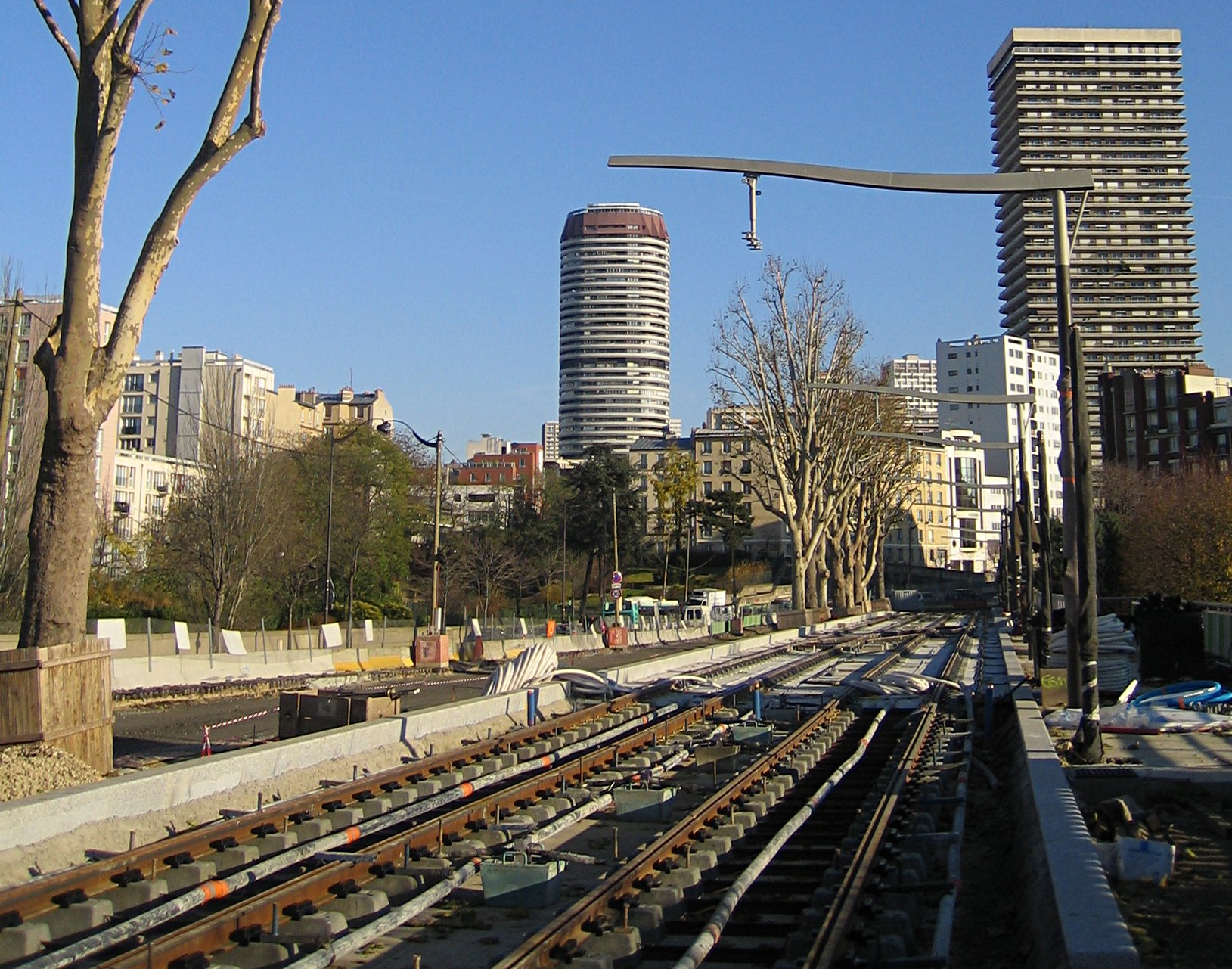
- Tower visible in the centre
- Interactive map of the Tour Super-Italie area

General information
- Type: Residential
- Location: Paris 13th arr.
- Coordinates: 48°49′18″N 2°21′33″E
- Construction started: 1970
- Completed: 1974

Height
- Antenna spire: 112 m (367 ft)
- Roof: 112 m (367 ft)

Technical details
- Floor count: 38

Design and construction
- Architect: Maurice Novarina

The Tour Super-Italie is a residential skyscraper in the 13th arrondissement of Paris, France. Its exact address is 121-127, Avenue d'Italie. The mainly residential tower was built by the architect Maurice Novarina, assisted by the architects Jacques Giovannoni and Léger. It includes a private indoor swimming pool and a solarium accessible by a staircase from the 34th floor.

== History ==
Inaugurated in February 1974, with a total height of 112 metres, Super-Italie is the tallest tower of an urban planning operation, known as Italie 13, which consisted of building residential towers in Paris' 13th arrondissement. A second tower of identical shape was planned to be built in the same block. However, the pausing of Italie 13 ordered during the mandate of the French President Valéry Giscard d'Estaing has led to the cancellation of the project.

Also known in the neighbourhood under the nickname of the round tower, the tower distinguishes from the other towers of the arrondissement by its cylindrical shape while others are parallelepipeds. Its total weight is of 44,000 tons, which represents about 4.5 times the weight of the Eiffel Tower.

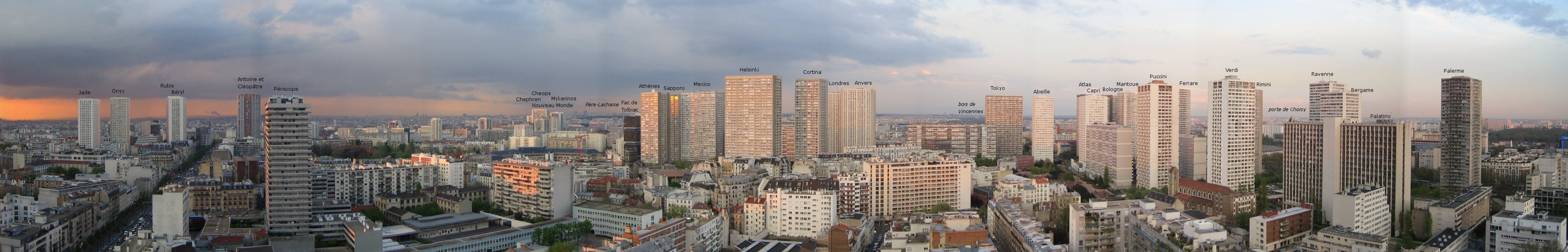
View from the Tour Super-Italie of the residential towers in Paris's 13th arrondissement near the Place d'Italie

== Transport ==
This site is served by the Maison Blanche metro station.

== See also ==
- Skyscraper
- Italie 13
- List of tallest structures in Paris
