= Cheminée du Front de Seine =

Chimney in Paris, France

Coordinates: 48°51′2″N 2°17′10″E

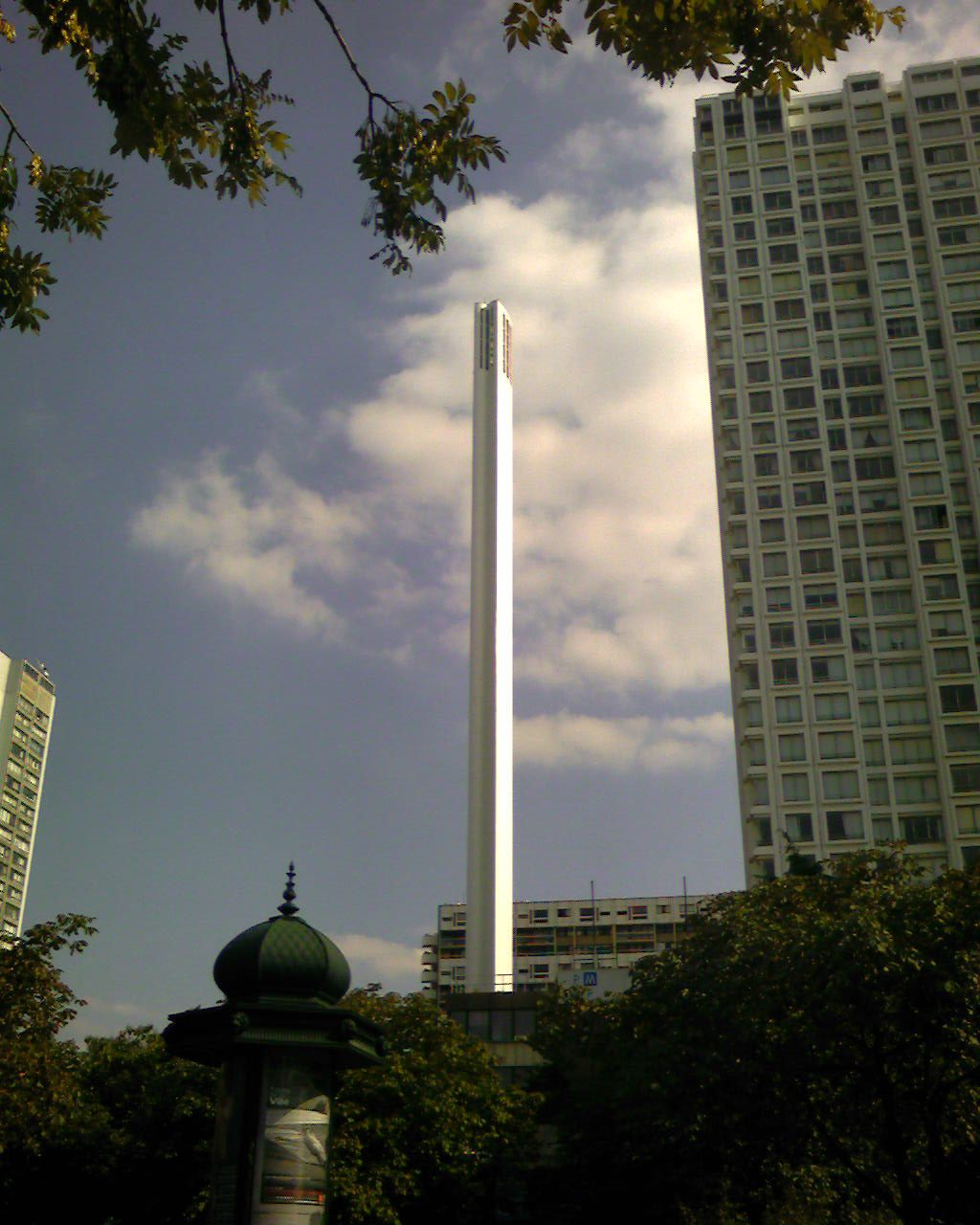
The chimney

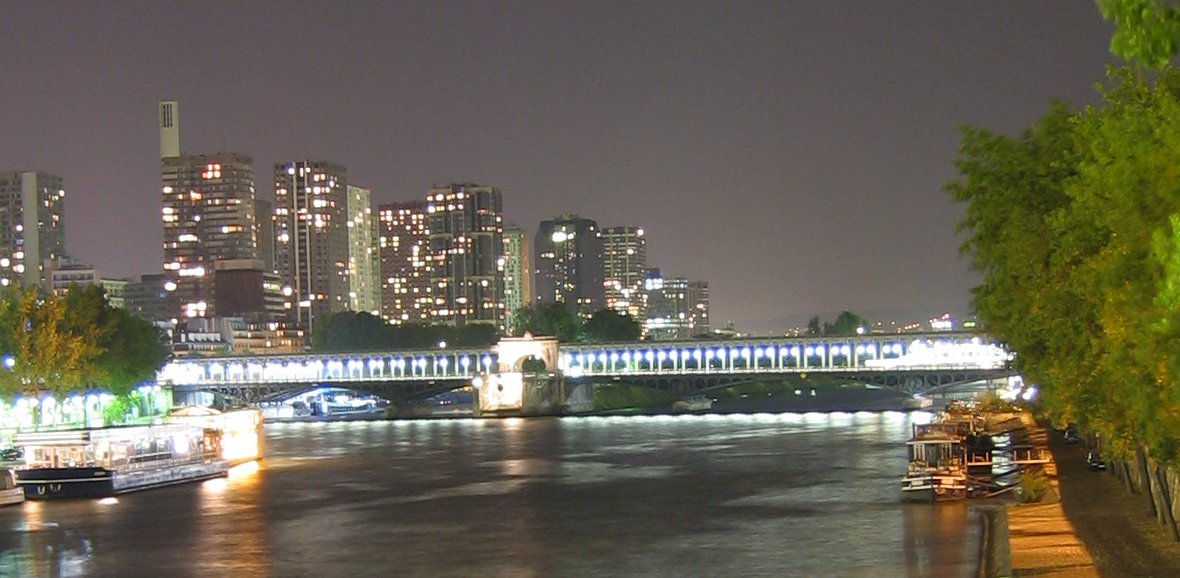
Top of chimney visible on the left

The Front-de-Seine Chimney (French: Cheminée du Front-de-Seine) or Grenelle Chimney (French: Cheminée de Grenelle) is a chimney located in the Grenelle district in the 15th arrondissement of Paris. It was constructed at the beginning of the 1970s to vent fumes from a boiler room of the Parisian District Heating Company (CPCU). This plant supplies the heat network that serves the surrounding buildings of the Front de Seine district, among others.

At 130 metres high, the chimney is one of the tallest structures in Paris. It stands out because of its aesthetic approach, having been designed by François Stahly, a sculptor and not an architect.

A nesting box for falcons is installed on top of the chimney.

== Location ==
The chimney is situated on the esplanade of Beaugrenelle, next to the Place de Brazzaville and the Square Béla-Bartok. It is surrounded by the highrise buildings of Front de Seine in the Grenelle district in the 15th arrondissement of Paris.

== Usage ==
The chimney vents combustion fumes released by the burners in the adjoining boiler room. This plant, operated by the Parisian District Heating Company (CPCU), produces steam that is distributed to buildings in the district through underground pipes for central heating and domestic hot water.

It burns ultra-low-sulfur diesel (ULSD). It outputs 590 tons of steam per hour. Ordinarily, four of the six available boilers are used. The last two are only used during cold spells or when other CPCU production sites are unavailable (this production site is fully connected to the distribution network of the CPCU in Paris and in the Île-de-France).

In 2016, the boiler house underwent renovations in order to run on biodiesel instead of fuel oil. The boiler's output has increased by 5% to 8% and the level of pollutants has fallen by a factor of 10.

== Height ==
At a height of 130 metres, the chimney is the tallest structure in the district, surpassing the other buildings by more than 30 metres. It is the sixth tallest structure in the commune of Paris, after the Eiffel Tower, the Tour Montparnasse, the Tour Duo n°1, the Tribunal de Paris, and the Hyatt Regency Paris Étoile. It is taller than the second floor of the Eiffel Tower.

It is the minimum height to avoid the wind blowing the fumes onto neighbouring buildings, and thus to limit air pollution. This height was determined by experiments in a wind tunnel on a scale model of the neighbouring buildings, which involved changing the speed and the direction of the wind, as well as the rate of the release of fumes.

== History ==
The chimney was designed by the sculptor François Stahly and was constructed between 1970 and 1971.

The choice of a sculptor rather than an architect to design this chimney was due to the strong opposition of the municipal authorities to anything that might resemble industrial architecture at the start of the project for the construction of the heat network. However, the chimney was impossible to conceal within a building, and had to be a stand-alone structure, such that the architect Bernard Zehrfuss recommended a sculptor, Stahly, for its design. The aim was for it to be designed as a work of art, to turn it into "a signal that has its place in the landscape," rather than "an eyesore."

Initially, the chimney was intended to become narrower at the top to increase the rate of release of fumes, but it was deemed unaesthetic. To conceal this, Stahly designed a structure to cover it, which was tested in a wind tunnel to avoid fumes being blown back onto the chimney tower.

The construction of the chimney alone cost 4 million francs.

A scale model of the chimney was presented to Les Halles from the 10th June to the 30th August 1970 for an exhibition organised by the Centre for Industrial Creation (CCI).

== Description and Criticism ==
The shape of the chimney is refined and it is completely white, with the exception of purely aesthetic vents located at the top of the structure. The tower is made from reinforced concrete.

The journalist Christian Taillandier categorises its figure as "lively and elegant." Others find in it a "general aesthetic that vaguely reminds one of the Vendôme Column." In her novel The Patriarchs, Anne Berest describes it as "refined and white" and refers to it metaphorically as "a Front de Seine lighthouse."

== Aquatic garden ==
The chimney is accompanied by an aquatic garden on the roof of the boiler house, which was designed by Catherine Stahly-Mougin, the daughter of the sculptor.

However, seepage of stagnant water from the pools, due to a lack of drainage for rainwater and watertight sealing, led to the pools being emptied in 1995 and, later, to a full renovation of the gardens.

== Ornithology ==
Since autumn 2011, a pair of peregrine falcons have settled in a nesting box located at the top of the chimney. This nesting box had been installed about fifteen years earlier, in august 1994, for a pair of common kestrels that then abandoned it.

It is the first pair of peregrine falcons recorded in Paris since the end of the 19th Century, and since 1947 in the Île-de-France (the last sightings were in Boucle de Moisson in Yvelines, and in the rocks of Chantemesle in the Val-d'Oise).

The nest is under constant camera surveillance, and three chicks hatched from a clutch in spring 2013.
