= Place d'Italie =

Square in Paris, France

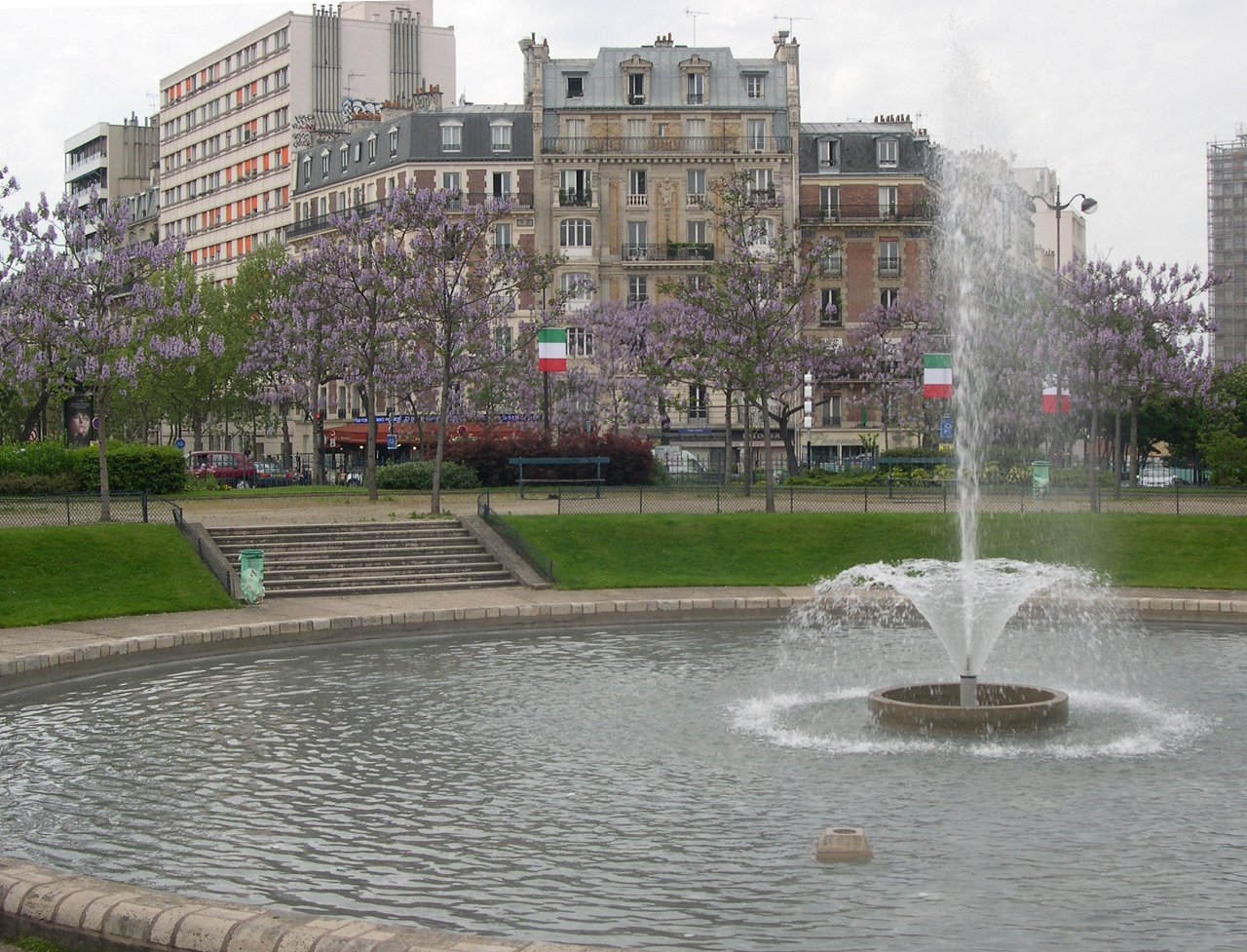
- Place d'Italie

- Location within Paris
- Length: 200 m (660 ft)
- Width: 200 m (660 ft)
- Arrondissement: 13th
- Quarter: Salpetrière
- Coordinates: 48°49′53.8″N 2°21′20.8″E

Construction
- Completion: Unknown
- Denomination: Italie

The Place d'Italie (French pronunciation: [plas ditali]; English: Italy Square) is a public space within the 13th arrondissement of Paris. The square has an average dimension of less than 200 meters in extent (comprising about 30,000 m^{2}), and the following streets meet there:

- Boulevard Vincent-Auriol
- Boulevard de l'Hôpital
- Boulevard Auguste-Blanqui
- Avenue des Gobelins
- Avenue de la Sœur-Rosalie
- Avenue d'Italie
- Avenue de Choisy
- Rue Bobillot
- Rue Godefroy

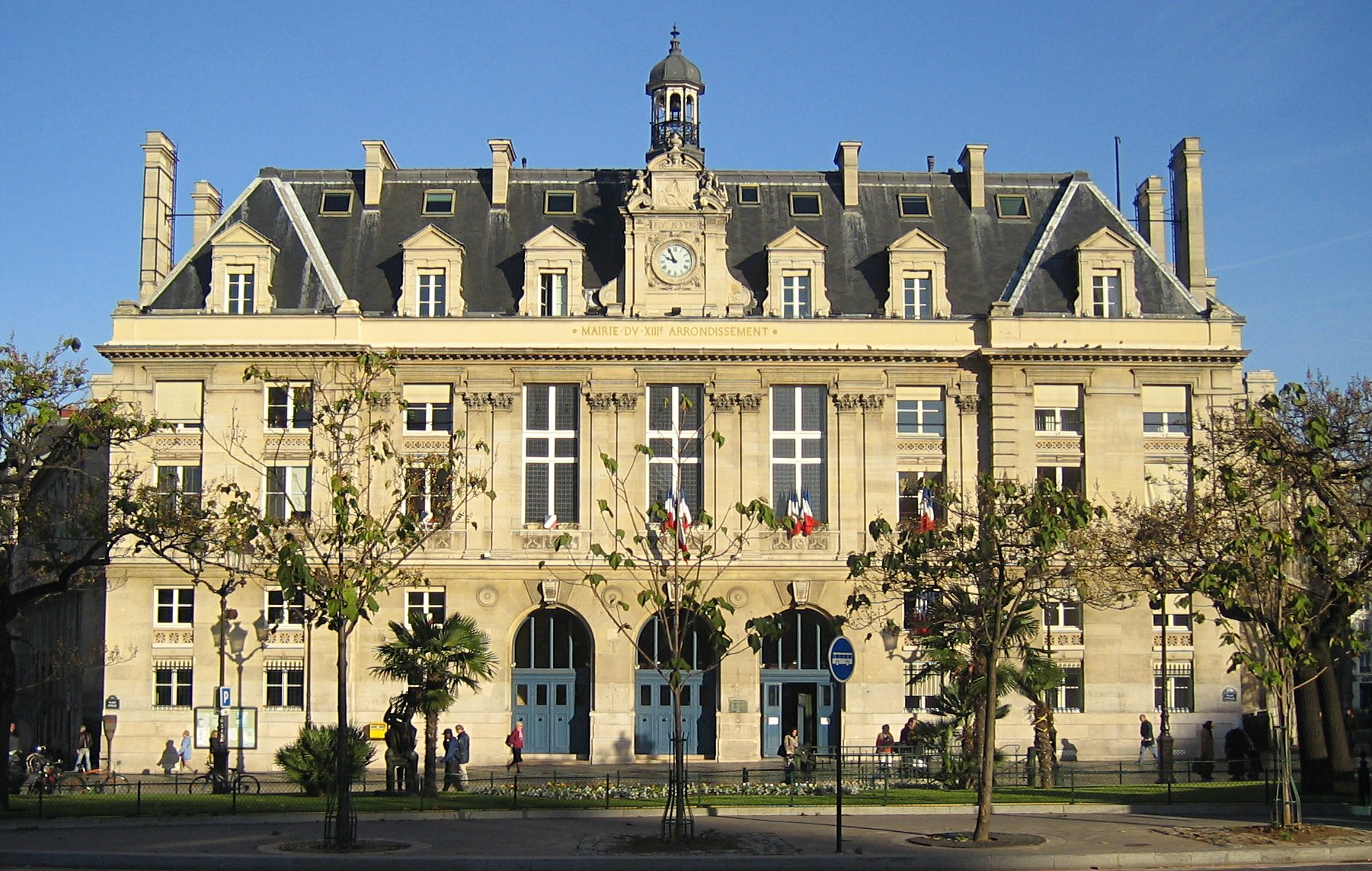
The mairie of the 13th arrondissement

The town hall (mairie) for the 13th arrondissement is on the Place d'Italie.

== History ==
=== The barrier of Italy ===
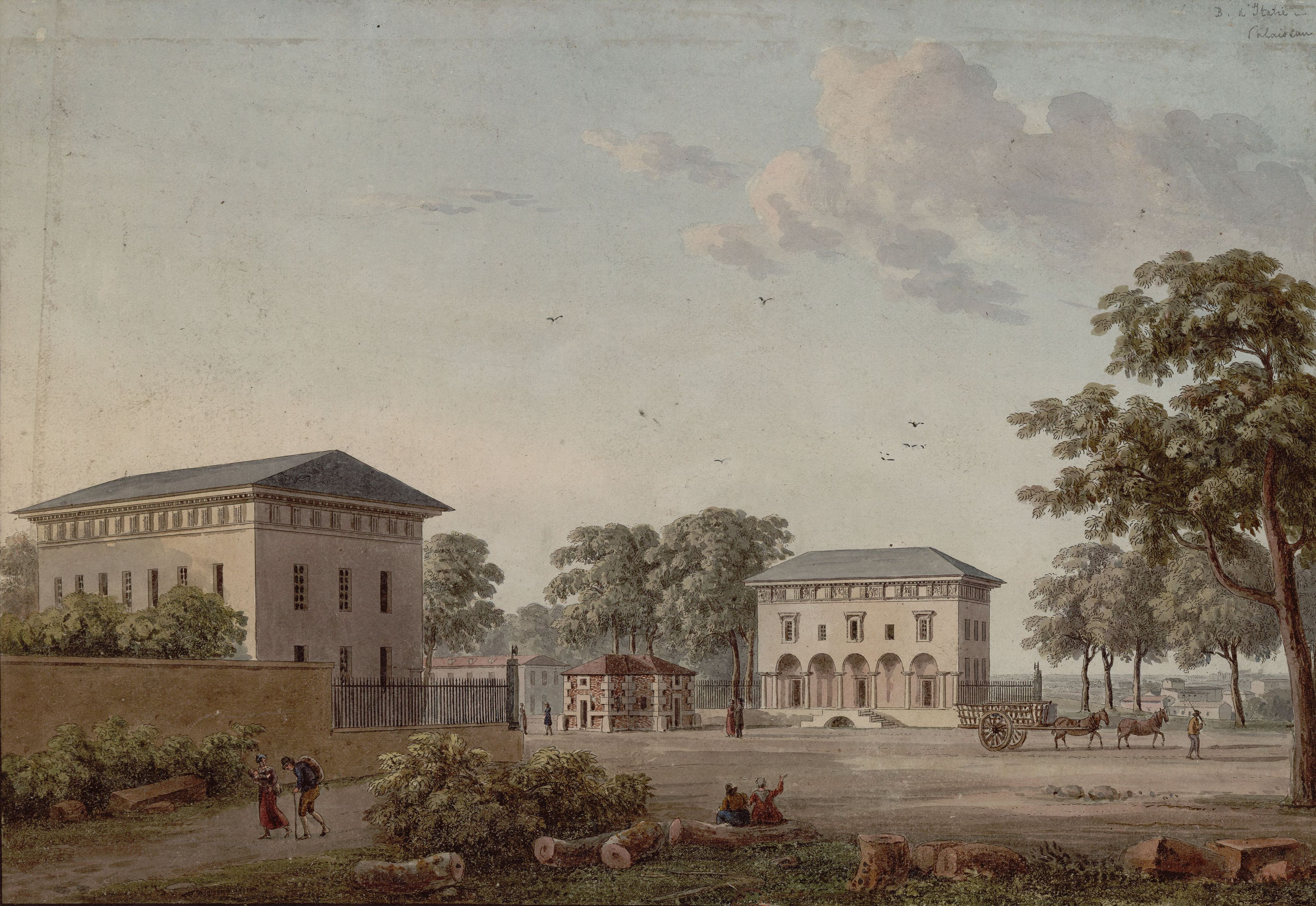
The old Barrière d'Italie in 1819

The Place d'Italie takes its name from its proximity to the Avenue d'Italie, which, traditionally, has been the point of departure on the road that links Paris and Italy, a route now called the RN7 (Route nationale 7).

Until the expansion of Paris was initiated by Baron Haussmann, the site of the Place d'Italie was occupied by a section of the Wall of the Farmers-General (the wall built, under the ancien régime, to prevent the evasion of excise taxes) that separated Paris from the suburb of Gentilly. The architect, Claude Nicolas Ledoux, had constructed two pavilions for the collection of the octroi, a local tariff levied on products entering towns, which were burned during the revolution of 1789, but rebuilt and not completely eradicated until 1877.

It was on this spot that General Jean-Baptiste Fidèle Bréa was arrested by the insurgents on 25 June 1848 during the June Uprising, before being put to death in a public spectacle on the Avenue d'Italie.

The annexation of communities bordering on Paris and the suppression of the city walls in 1860 allowed for the construction of a large roundabout which, it was hoped, could play the role of a Place de l'Étoile of the left bank. It took the place of the barrière d'Italie (barrier of Italy) and part of the Avenue des Gobelins, as well as the road leading to the Ivry interchange, and, mostly, the Boulevard d'Italie and the Boulevard d'Ivry themselves.

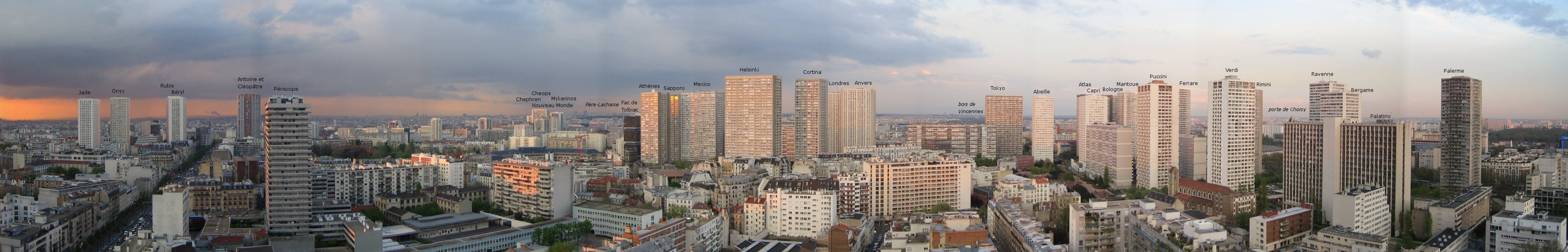
View of the three main groupings of towers from the Tour Super-Italie

The Italie 13 project, a grand exercise in urbanism, was conceived in the 1960s, and, under this plan, the Place d'Italie represented the center of a district of high-rise towers stretching out along the entire length of the Avenue d'Italie, with the construction of a truly spectacular tower, taller than the Montparnasse Tower, called the Apogee Tower, on the Place d'Italie itself. The project began with the construction, close to the Place d'Italie, of six inter-related towers, each about one hundred metres tall, but because of scathing criticism from the Parisian citizenry and indifferent support from the Giscard d'Estaing government, the effort was mostly abandoned in 1975. Some sort of mast or multi-colored campanile, conceived by Kenzo Tange, is planned for the plot of land originally expected to be used by the Apogee Tower, replaced, since 1992, by a collection of smaller buildings, an office building, a luxury residential building, as well as the famous audio-visual complex, Grand Écran Italie (Big Screen Italy).

=== The heart of the 13th arrondissement ===
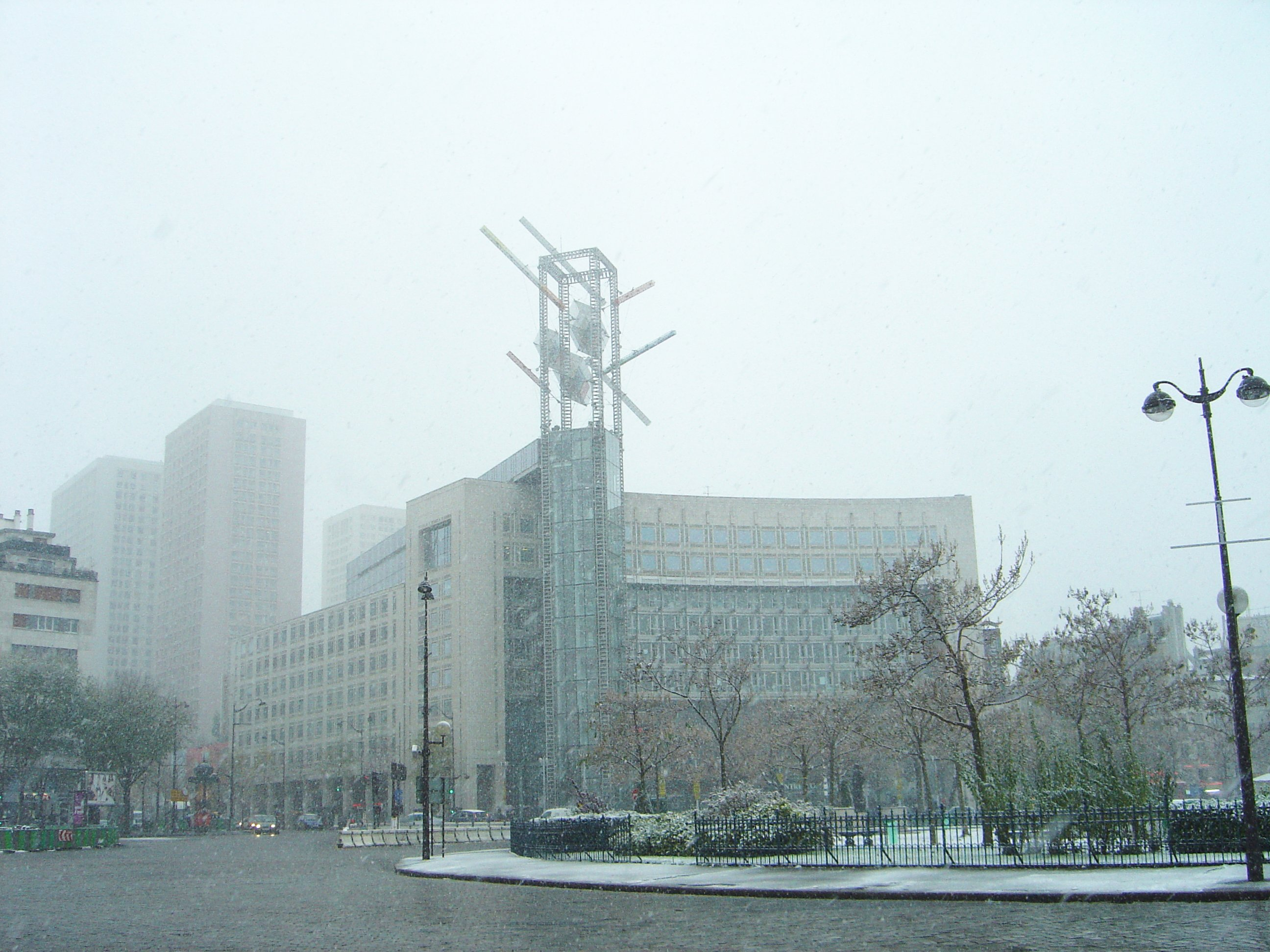
Snow at Place d'Italie, November 2005

The Place d'Italie, where the principal districts of the arrondissement (Quartier des Gobelins, the Asian quarter, Butte aux Cailles, etc.) converge, is the center of automobile traffic circulation and a crossroads for most of the métro and bus lines in this part of Paris. It is a major crossing-point for those leaving the city for the suburbs (and vice versa) and for those travelling between Montparnasse and the rive droite (right bank). One of the largest concentrations of Parisian business activity is in the general area of the Place d'Italie.

Furthermore, it is a place for going out at night. The restaurants and cinémas of the Avenue des Gobelins attract many who are in search of diversion. One of the most important movie houses in Paris and the largest 35-millimetre screen in the capital, the Gaumont Grand Écran Italie (temporarily closed) is directly on the square. It can be widely regarded that the 13th arrondissement revolves around the Place d'Italie, all except for the Paris Rive Gauche district along the Seine.

== Sites of interest ==
- The center of the square is devoted to a small green-space. Facing the Avenue d'Italie, there is a monument in memory of the Marshal of France, Alphonse Juin, completed by the architect, Henri Cantie, the sculptor, André Greck, and the foundryman, Daniel Landowski, in 1983.
- Two subway entrances, the works of Hector Guimard, have been registered in the supplemental list of historic places since 1978.
- At number 17 on the access road, Rue Godefroy, located between the Boulevard de l'Hôpital and the Boulevard Vincent Auriol, a plaque recalls that the Chinese premier, Zhou Enlai lived on this site, then a modest rooming house, during his time in Paris, 1922 to 1924.
- In the small garden behind the municipal building for the arrondissement, there is a sculpture, "Return of the Prodigal Son", executed in 1964 by Ossip Zadkine.
- A large shopping mall whose modern look was designed by the famed architect, Kenzo Tange, is also located on the square. It is called Italie 2.
- The esplanade on the side of the mall nearest the Avenue d'Italie was named Place Henri-Langlois in 1995 to honour Henri Langlois, a French pioneer of the film archive movement.

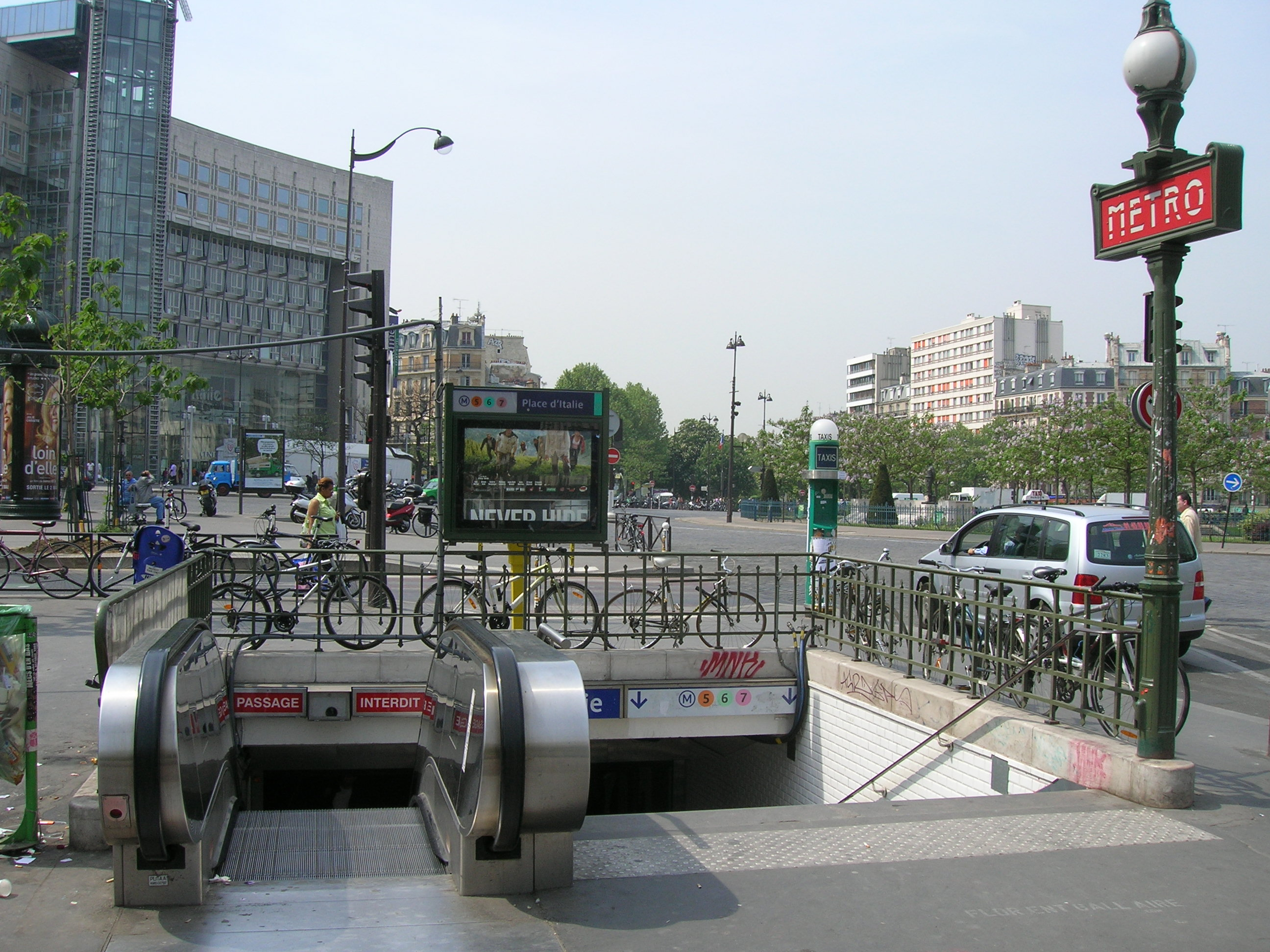
Metro entrance in the Place d'Italie

== Metro station ==
The Place d'Italie is:

Located near the Metro station: Place d'Italie.

It is served by lines 5, 6, and 7.

== Cultural references ==
A fictionalized Place d'Italie was the setting of several lessons in Voix et Images de France, an audio-visual French language instruction method used widely in schools in the 1960s and 1970s. Developed by the Centre de Recherche et d'Etude pour la Diffusion du Français (CREDIF) at the Ecole Normale Superieure de Saint-Cloud in France, this method matched lines of prerecorded French dialogue to corresponding projected images of French people and locales to enable students to learn the language by placing it in various visual and conversational contexts. The program's fictional characters included Monsieur Thibaut, Madame Thibaut and their children, Catherine and Paul, who all lived at No. 10 Place d'Italie. This is a real apartment building with street-level stores in the square (pictured in the insert above), built around the turn of the 20th century in a combination of French Mansard and English Jacobethan architectural styles.

Singer Céline Dion referenced the Place d'Italie in her song Trois heures vingt, written by Eddy Marnay in 1984 on her Les oiseaux du bonheur album. In the song, she and her love interest plan on meeting and beginning their happily ever after at 3:20 at the Place d'Italie.

== See also ==
- Place d'Italie (Paris Metro)
