= Avenue d'Italie =

Coordinates: 48.8255°N 2.3575°E

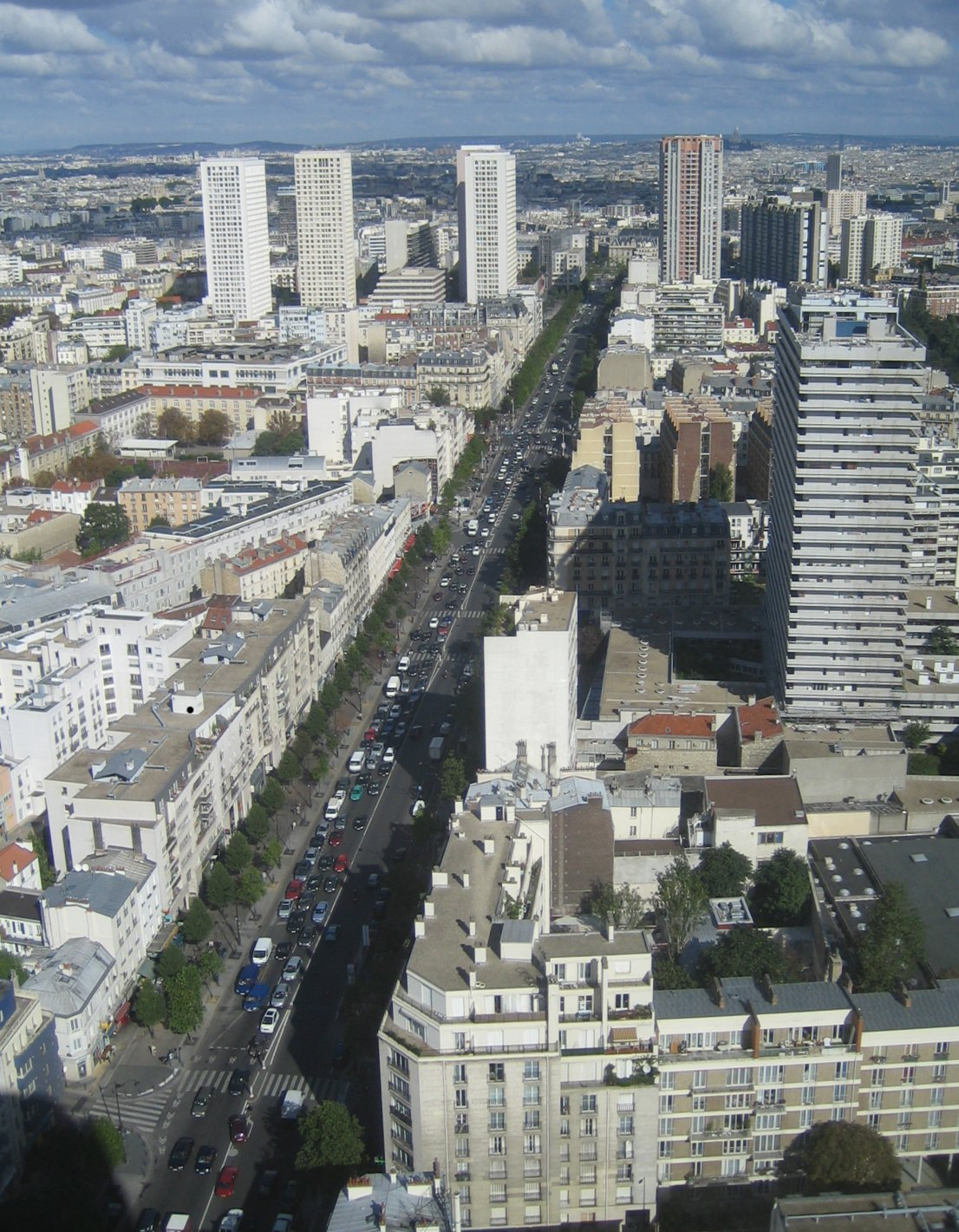
Avenue d'Italie, 2005

The Avenue d'Italie (French pronunciation: [avny ditali]) is one of the main communication axes of the 13th arrondissement of Paris. It goes from the Place d'Italie to the Porte d'Italie, crossing the Rue de Tolbiac. Line 7 of the Paris metro has four stations along the avenue.

== Description ==
The avenue is 1,294 m long and 70 m wide. It takes its name from the destination of the travellers who used to continue straight after the Porte d'Italie. It is there that Nationale 7, a road linking Paris to the Italian border, begins.

The Avenue d'Italie is part of the Maison-Blanche district, and separates two very different parts of the 13th arrondissement: the Butte-aux-Cailles district on one side, and the Chinese district on the other.

== History ==
Until the middle of the 19th century, the avenue only contained a few houses and guinguettes. Prices were cheaper than in Paris, because it was outside of the Wall of the Ferme générale.

The Avenue d'Italie got its current name on May 23, 1863, after Georges-Eugène Haussmann's decision to extend the Paris city limits in 1860.
