= Porte d'Italie =

City gate of Paris

Coordinates: 48.818889°N 2.359444°E

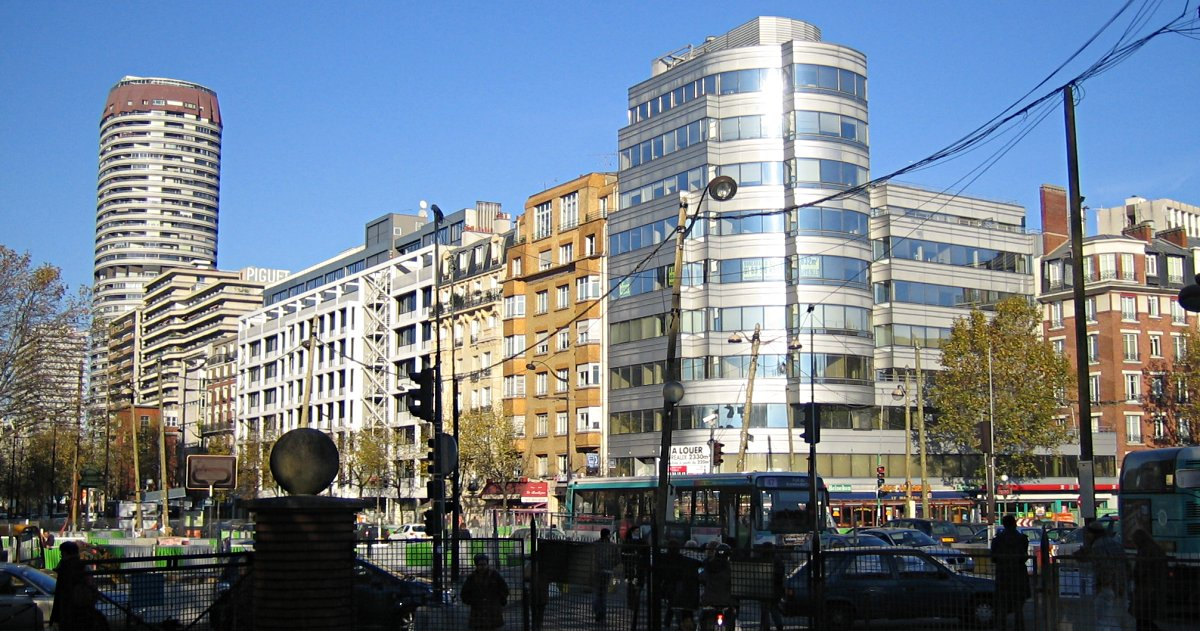
Porte d'Italie, 2005

The Porte d'Italie is one of the city gates of Paris, located in the 13th arrondissement, at the intersection of the Avenue d'Italie, the Boulevard Massena, the Avenue de la Porte d'Italie and the Rue Kellermann, facing Le Kremlin-Bicêtre.

The Porte d'Italie is the starting point of Route nationale 7 between Paris and Italy, hence its name.

It is conveniently located between the 87 and 88 bastions of the old Thiers wall.

== Transport ==
The Porte d'Italie Metro station and a stop on Paris tramway Line 3a are located at the gate.
