= Italie 2 =

Shopping centre in Paris

Coordinates: 48°49′49″N 2°21′19″E

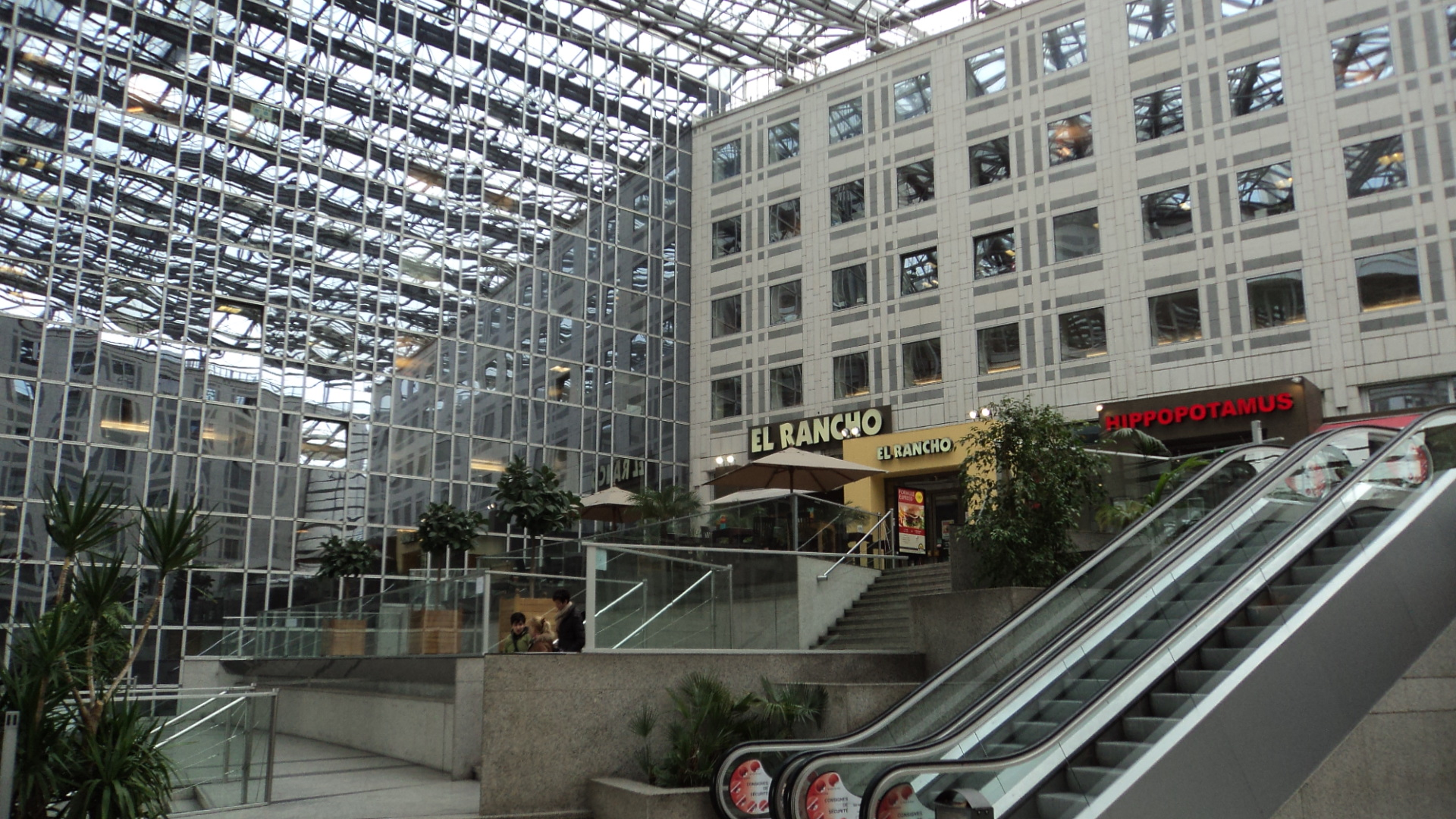
Italie 2

Italie Deux is a large shopping centre in Paris's south east in the 13th arrondissement owned by Ingka Centres. It features an IKEA, a Carrefour Market supermarket and over 130 stores, featuring national brands primarily. The centre is situated over 3 levels with one level being subterranean (bas), one at ground level (rdc) and one above ground level (haut). The shopping centre is the largest within the perimeter of boulevard périphérique, Paris's ring road that typically confines Paris itself and is an unofficial boundary. This is mainly because the only other places with a department store in Paris are not situated within a shopping centre with the exception of Galeries Lafayette Montparnasse which is situated in a small shopping centre of about 10 stores at the base of Tour Montparnasse.

The centre is situated on Place d'Italie and is above Place d'Italie metro station.
