= Beaugrenelle shopping mall =

Shopping mall in Paris

Coordinates: 48.8482°N 2.2825°E

Beaugrenelle
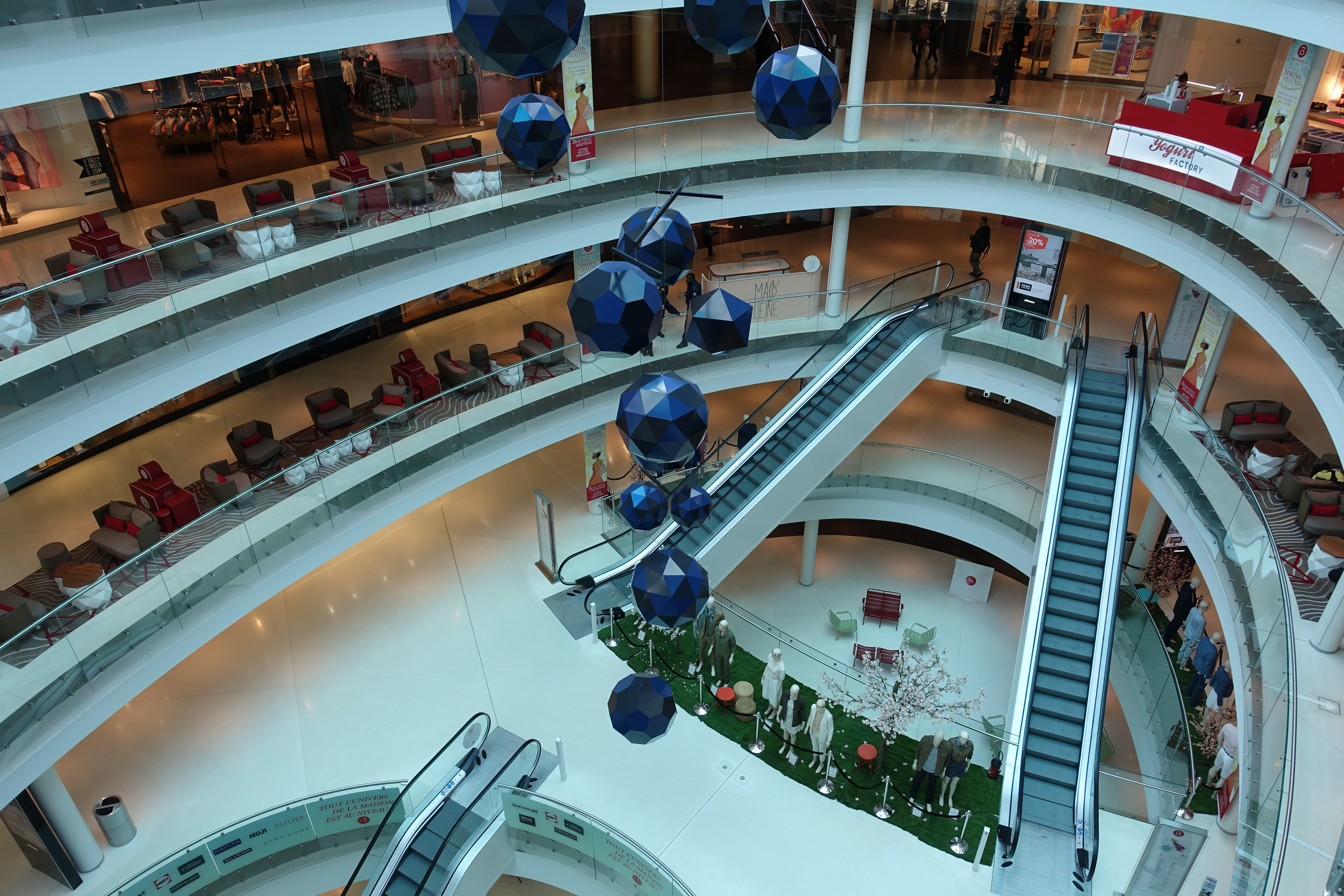
- Location: 15th arrondissement, Paris, France
- Opened: 1979 (original mall); 2013 (current mall)
- Owner: Gecina
- Num. of stores: Over 120
- Website: beaugrenelle-paris.com/en

Beaugrenelle is a shopping mall located in the 15th arrondissement of Paris, close to the Seine. It is one of the biggest shopping malls in Paris' inner city. A mix between a department store and a shopping mall, Beaugrenelle is home to 120 shops and restaurants.

== History ==
The story of the Beaugrenelle shopping mall began in the 1970s with the development of a new neighborhood. The first Beaugrenelle shopping mall, which opened in 1979, was an integral part of a residential complex built in the typical brutalist style of the time.

By 1999, the shopping mall was in decline, consequently a complete renovation project was launched in 2003 by the new owner Gecina.

The architecture was largely responsible for this slow, irreversible decline. The neighborhood had been designed according to a utopian vision particular to France: in the 1960s and 1970s, urban planners believed that functional areas, such as shops and living spaces, should be elevated and separated from the traffic. This functionalism also lay behind the design of La Défense, La Part Dieu in Lyon and other new towns, and was based on the sanitary principles laid out in the Athens Charter.

When the decision was taken to redevelop the mall, investor-developer Apsys, won the competition. Its project was to demolish the existing center, extend its perimeter, incorporate it into the city and bring it down to the Seine.

Ten years later, the new Beaugrenelle mall opened its doors on 23 October 2013.

== Architecture ==
=== Buildings ===
Designed by Valode & Pistre, a Paris-based architecture firm known for designing and building Renault Technocentre and Incity Tower in Lyon, the shopping mall extends over six floors.

One hundred and twenty stores and restaurants are spread over 50,000 m^{2} of fashion retail space, divided into three buildings: Magnetic, Panoramic and City. The Magnetic and Panoramic buildings are linked by a covered pedestrian bridge, creating a gateway to the 15th arrondissement from the River Seine. One of the special architectural features of the Beaugrenelle mall is the exoskeleton walkway, an external steel skeleton wrapped round a glass tube. Its form is reminiscent of its illustrious neighbors: the Eiffel Tower and Bir-Hakeim bridge.

The mall's main construction materials are metal, resin, double glazing and lacquered metal, giving the building a modern and futuristic atmosphere. Denis Valode and Jean Pistre wanted the mall "to fit in with the neighborhood's architectural history, continuing the style of the metal frame architecture of the Bir-Hakeim viaduct and the Eiffel Tower, which are both close by". Metal was therefore the obvious material for the latticing framing the building islands and enclosing the walkways.

=== Atrium ===
The two atria are illuminated by skylights, filling the shopping mall's six floors with natural daylight. Each atrium is covered in a metallic glass roof which changes color according to the time of day and the light conditions.

A matching blue mobile, designed by the French artist Xavier Veilhan, adorns one of the atria and creates a link between retail and culture. The 'Grand Mobile' is 15 meters high and was originally created for the Dynamo exhibition at the Grand Palais in 2013.

=== Cinema ===
Beaugrenelle shopping mall is also home to a 10-screen movie theater Pathé designed by the French designer Ora-ïto. His approach was to engage the senses. The undulating lines on the ceilings and floors help to guide through the various spaces. Strong, contemporary colors, such as ‘Pathé’ yellow and gray are used throughout, and combined with natural wood. Ora-ïto also used white and yellow Corian for the ticket counters and service areas.

=== Green Roof ===
Sustainability was one of the main concerns regarding the construction of the building. Considering the risks to biodiversity in cities, the architects decided to develop a green roof. Measuring 7,000 m^{2}, it is the biggest green roof in Paris.

The roof is home to 40,000 plant species irrigated by rainwater, bees and birds, which benefit from a partnership concluded with the French league for the protection of birds (LPO). The bees are kept in six hives on the roof, producing 50–100 kg of honey a year.

A 700 m^{2} community garden allows local inhabitants to take care of their production.

== Stores ==
There are 120 shops and restaurants in the mall.

Beaugrenelle is a mix between a department store and a shopping mall. Its three theme-oriented buildings are home to 61 dedicated fashion outlets.

The mall also includes 10 stores dedicated to beauty and well-being products, 12 devoted to household items, and 14 that sell cultural and leisure goods. In addition, Beaugrenelle offers some brands that do not usually feature in shopping malls, such as Guerlain and Baccarat.

=== Restaurants and bars ===
The shopping mall also features 11 restaurants and 8 snack bars.

A centralized tax refund service, free Wi-Fi, tourist information, personal shopper and hotel delivery are some of the services available.

== Events ==
Beaugrenelle organizes events every year.

In 2015 the mall participated to the International Contemporary Art Fair in Paris. Named "Think Big" an exhibition of 16 works of art was displayed in the mall.

At Christmas time, it partners with Disneyland Paris to decorate the shopping mall with Disney characters.

== Awards ==
Beaugrenelle has won international awards:

- Best European Shopping Centre Award – ICSC (International Council of Shopping Centers) (2015)
- Global Award for Excellence – ULI (Urban Land Institute) (2015)
