= Front de Seine =

District in Paris, France

Coordinates: 48°51′3.87″N 2°17′7.61″E

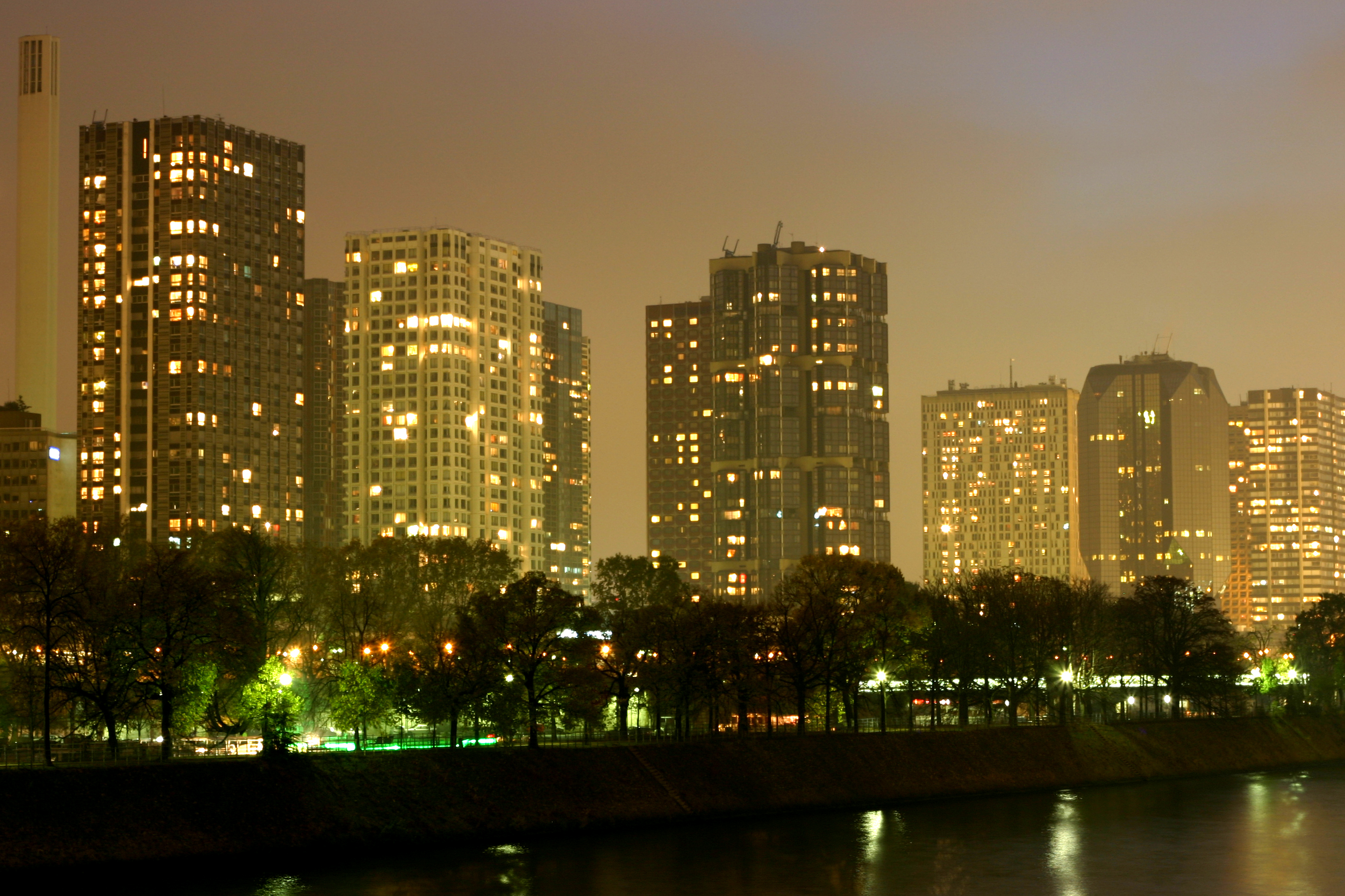
Front de Seine - Beaugrenelle

Front de Seine as seen from Pont Mirabeau

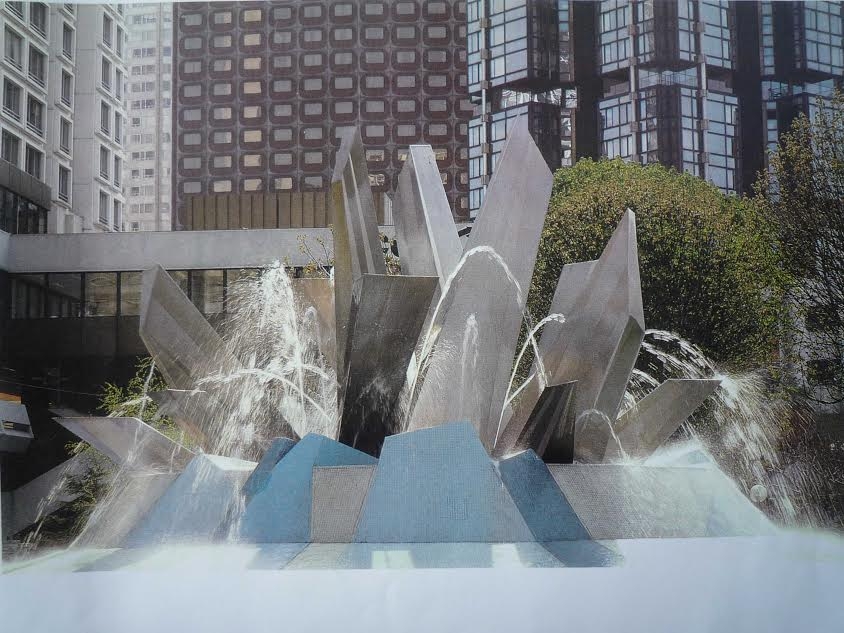
Sculpture-fountain "Cristaux" by Jean-Yves Lechevallier nestled in a small park between the towers

Front de Seine (French pronunciation: [fʁɔ̃ də sɛn]) is a development in the district of Beaugrenelle in Paris, France, located along the river Seine in the 15th arrondissement at the south of the Eiffel Tower. It is, with the 13th arrondissement, one of the few districts in the city of Paris containing highrise buildings, as most have been constructed outside the city (notably in La Défense).

The Front de Seine district is the result of an urban planning project from the 1970s. It includes about 20 towers reaching nearly 100 m of height built all around an elevated esplanade. That esplanade is paved with frescos that can be seen only from the elevated floors of the towers. As opposed to Italie 13, the design of the towers is much more varied. The Hôtel Novotel Paris-Tour Eiffel (formerly known as Hôtel Nikkō), for instance, has red-encircled windows, while the Tour Totem consists of a stack of several glazed blocks. A newly redesigned shopping centre, the Centre commercial Beaugrenelle opened in 2013.

Furthermore, while 13th arrondissement towers are predominantly residential and La Défense towers are predominantly commercial, the towers of the Front de Seine are of mixed commercial and residential use.

== High-rise buildings ==
Front de Seine, 2021

- Tour Avant-Seine (1975): 98 m, 32 storeys.
- Tour Mars (1974): 98 m, 32 storeys.
- Tour Paris Côté Seine (1977): 98 m, 32 storeys.
- Tour Seine (1970): 98 m, 32 storeys
- Tour Espace 2000 (1976): 98 m, 31 storeys.
- Tour Évasion 2000 (1971): 98 m, 31 storeys.
- Hôtel Novotel Paris-Tour Eiffel (1976): 98 m, 31 storeys.
- Tour Totem (1979): 98 m, 31 storeys.
- Tour Beaugrenelle (1979): 98 m, 30 storeys.
- Tour Panorama (1974): 98 m, 30 storeys.
- Tour Perspective 1 (1973): 98 m, 30 storeys.
- Tour Perspective 2 (1975): 98 m, 30 storeys.
- Tour Reflets (1976): 98 m, 30 storeys.
- Tour Rive Gauche (1975): 98 m, 30 storeys.
- Tour Keller (1970): 98 m, 29 storeys.
- Tour Cristal (1990): 98 m, 27 storeys.
- 79 quai André Citroën: 24 storeys.
- Tour Mirabeau (1972): 18 storeys.
- Immeuble le Village (1973): 17 storeys.
- Bureaux Hachette Livre (1969): 12 storeys.
- Tour Mercure (1973): 12 storeys.

Other structures

- Cheminée du Front de Seine (1971): 130 meters

== See also ==
- Italie 13
- La Défense
- List of tallest structures in Paris
