= Les Olympiades =

Neighborhood of Paris located in the 13th arrondissement

Coordinates: 48°49′42.35″N 2°21′18.51″E

The esplanade of Les Olympiades, with Paris's Chinatown at the far southern edge.

Les Olympiades (French pronunciation: [lez‿ɔlɛ̃pjad]) is a district of residential towers located in the 13th arrondissement of Paris, France. Built from 1969 to 1974, the district consists of a dozen towers built along a huge esplanade, elevated eight metres from the ground, that is dedicated to pedestrians. A shopping mall, known as the Pagode, stands at the centre of the esplanade. Below it are streets dedicated to vehicular traffic. Shops and boutiques can easily receive deliveries on the lower level. The main entrances to the residential towers are on the esplanade.

Les Olympiades are designed similarly to the esplanade of La Défense. The Olympiades esplanade has maintained a rather important business and commercial activity, something that is not true of other projects in Paris and its suburbs. The northern part of the neighbourhood is typical of the 13th arrondissement, with the Parc de Choisy and Lycée Claude Monet at the northern edge of the Olympiades and the Place d'Italie three blocks north.

The eight tallest towers are each 104 metres (341 feet) tall and are named after cities that have hosted the Olympic games: Anvers (Antwerp), Athènes (Athens), Cortina (Cortina d'Ampezzo), Helsinki, Londres (London), Mexico (Mexico City), Sapporo, and Tokyo. Other residential buildings, which are wider than they are tall, complete the district.

Index	Tower	Address	Floors
1	Tour Sapporo	70 rue du Javelot	32
2	Tour Athènes	75 rue du Javelot	32
3	Tour Mexico	65 rue du Javelot	32
4	Tour Londres	27 rue du Javelot	33
5	Tour Anvers	32 rue du Javelot	34
6	Tour Helsinki	61 rue du Javelot	35
7	Tour Cortina	41 rue du Javelot	35
8	Tour Tokyo	20 avenue d'Ivry	31
9	Tour Grenoble	17 rue du Javelot	9
10	Tour Rome	47 rue du Javelot	16
11	Tour Squaw Valley	18 rue du Disque	16
12	Tour Oslo	44 avenue d'Ivry	11
13	Tour Olympie	101 rue de Tolbiac	13
Total	13 towers		329 floors

The opening in June 2007, of the new Métro station at Les Olympiades, as part of the driverless hi-speed Metro line 14 running every 4 minutes, brought Les Olympiades residents and visitors to the Olympiades complex and its esplanade — shops, restaurants, apartments, and recreational facilities — within 11–14 minutes of Saint-Lazare, Madeleine, and Pyramides on the opposite side of Paris and 2–4 minutes from the new Cour Saint-Émilion entertainment centre and Bibliothèque Nationale François Mitterrand.

Les Olympiades were built with the aspiration that a population of young professionals would be attracted to the complex offering multiple services (education, sports, etc.), a plan known and later criticized as Italie 13. From 1975, its southern end began to attract Vietnamese and Chinese residents, who also populated the main Chinatown in Paris around the southern end of the complex. Since the end of Project Italie 13 the Paris Rive Gauche project began. Starting a few hundred metres from the Olympiades, is the second large-scale urbanism project inside the city of Paris to be built since Italie 13, and they now form a geographic unity with a new influx of professionals and office, education, library, and other complexes, including the François Mitterrand Bibliothèque nationale de France.

== See also ==
- Olympiades (Paris Métro)
- Italie 13
- List of tallest structures in Paris
