= Vietnamese community in Paris =

Overview article

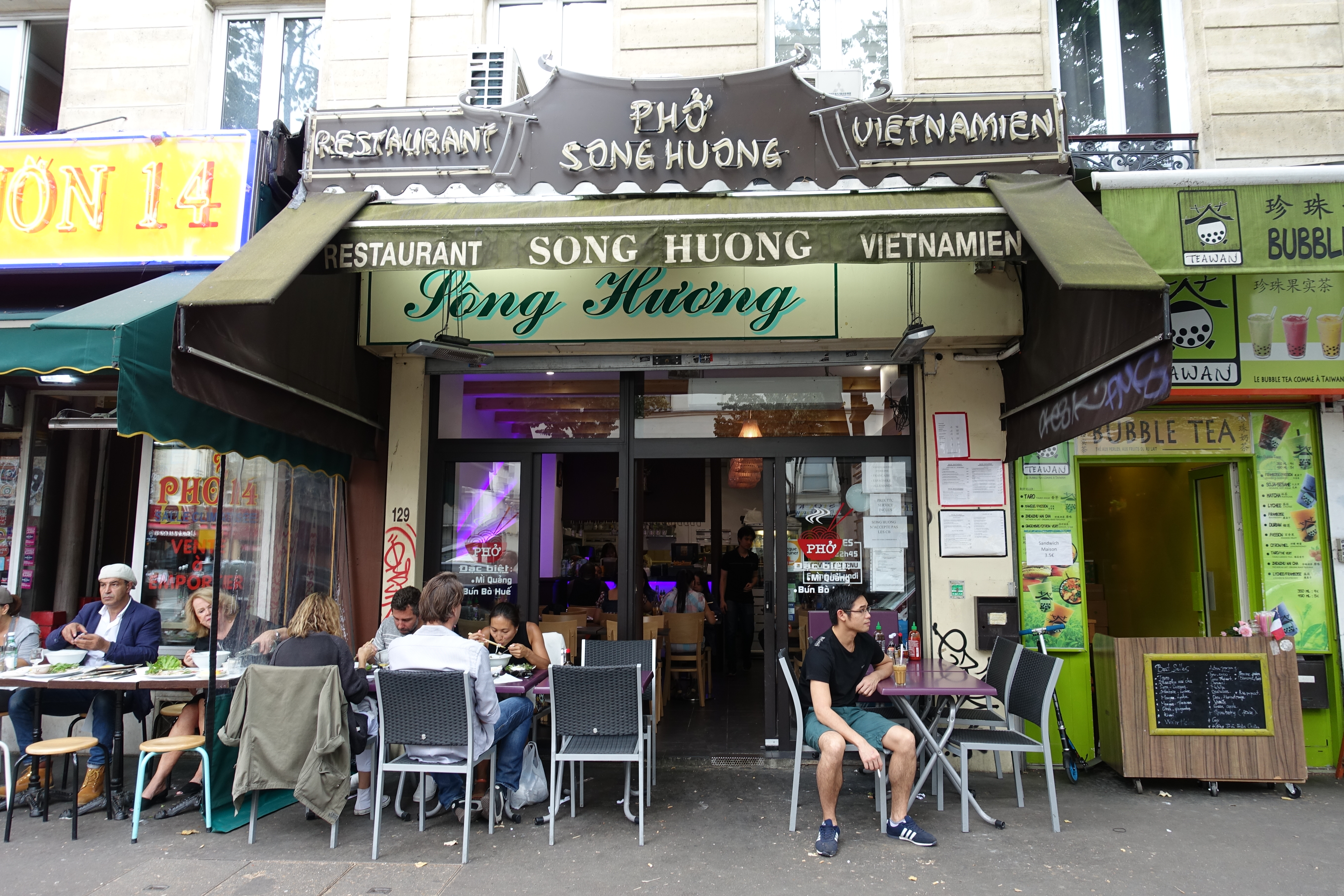
A Vietnamese restaurant on Avenue de Choisy in the Quartier Asiatique of the 13th arrondissement.

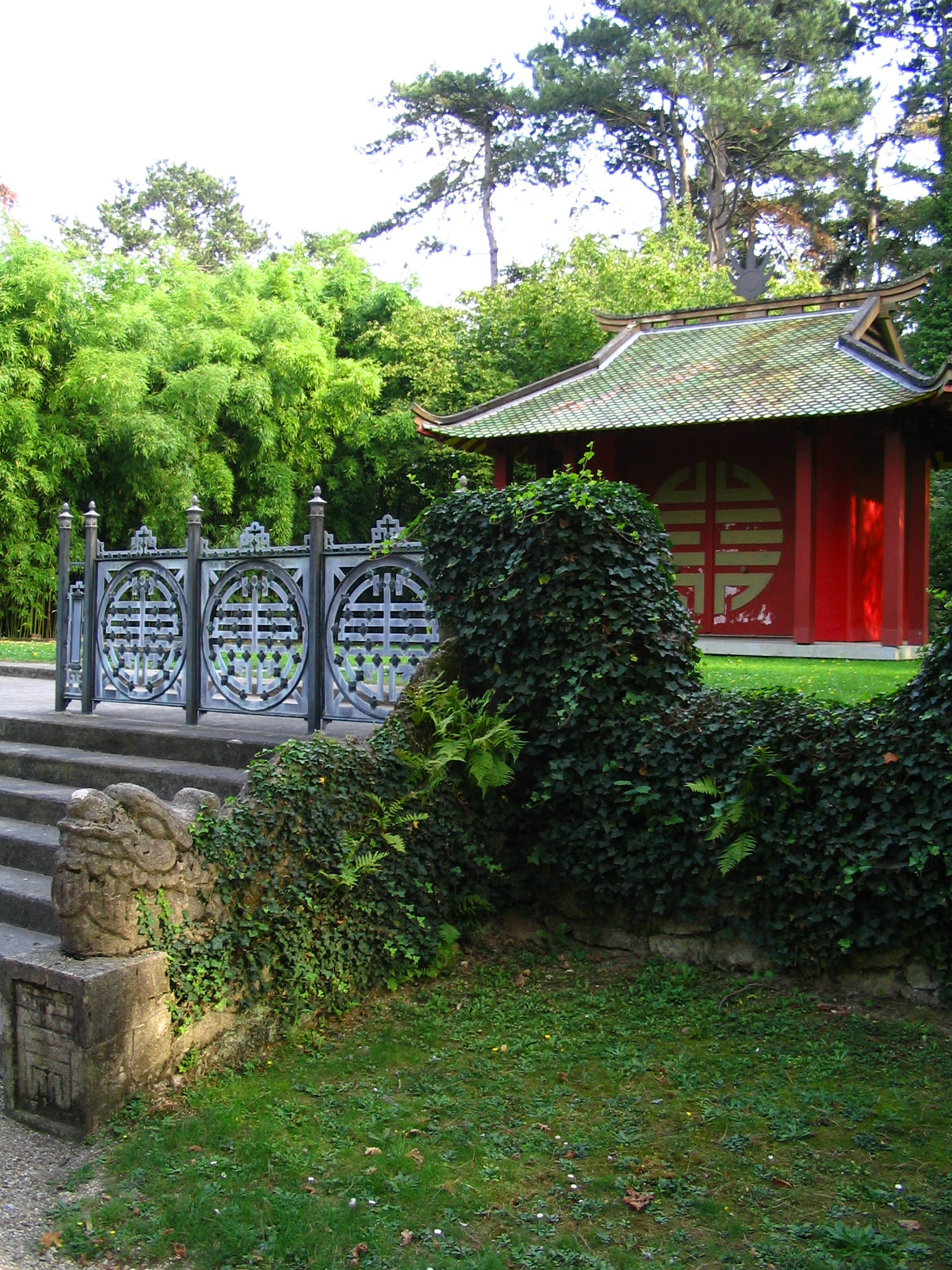
The Temple du Souvenir Indochinois in the Bois de Vincennes, erected in 1907, is a monument built by the earliest waves of Vietnamese migrants to France.

Paris is home to the oldest Overseas Vietnamese community in the Western world and is also one of the largest outside Vietnam. There are an estimated 70,000 people of Vietnamese descent within the city limits of Paris as of 2018, with the greater Île-de-France area home to another estimated 100,000. Both figures make the Paris metropolitan area host to one of the greatest concentrations of Vietnamese outside Vietnam.

In periods before 1975 several Vietnamese arrived in Paris, including intellectuals, those who worked as civil servants in colonial times, and those who came to Paris to study and did not return home. Ethnic Vietnamese arriving after 1975 became a part of an ethnic network established by those that came before them. Many Vietnamese achieved proficiency in the medical, scientific, and computer science fields.

== History ==
The first Vietnamese settlers to France consisted of diplomats and officials of the Nguyễn dynasty following the establishment of political relations between Vietnam and France in the latter half of the 18th century. Following the colonization of Vietnam by France in 1862, Paris became a destination for Vietnamese students to study at the city's numerous educational institutions, as well as intellectuals and artists. Returners to Vietnam among this group of migrants would play significant roles in shaping Vietnam's political and social scene during the colonial era and up until the end of the Vietnam War.

During World War I, roughly 50,000 Vietnamese were recruited as soldiers or workers by France to help with the war effort in the ruling country. Following the conflict, a large number of these migrants opted to stay in France, with a majority settling in Paris and working as factory laborers or in service jobs. The presence of this group formed the first significant Asian community in Paris and France. A 1927 estimate counted about 3,000 Vietnamese in Paris, with a majority of students from southern Vietnam (Cochinchina) and a majority of workers from northern Vietnam (Tonkin).

The interwar period saw a continuation of Vietnamese students, intellectuals and expatriates arriving in Paris. A number of important figures in modern Vietnamese history would study, work or live in Paris during this era. For instance, Ho Chi Minh returned to France in 1919 after an earlier sojourn and studied politics in the city, where he also drafted works demanding greater civil rights for Vietnamese in the Indochina colony. Another major Vietnamese figurehead studying in Paris during this time was Bảo Đại, who would become the last emperor of Vietnam. Numerous others who would also later play major political roles in Vietnam also studied in Paris up to Vietnamese independence in 1954, including Phan Chu Trinh and Ngô Đình Nhu.

Paris was also a prime destination for Vietnamese artists and professionals. Major Vietnamese musicians, artists and intellectuals who expatriated to Paris or immigrated to the city from the 1920s to 1970s include: Phạm Duy, Lam Phương, Trần Văn Khê and Trần Thanh Vân, among others. By the 1930s, a number of professionals had created community organizations to help serve the Vietnamese community, including Vietnamese Chinese who chose to associate themselves with the Vietnamese population rather than with Chinese settlers from mainland China.

Following Vietnam's independence from France in 1954, the former colonial ruler was still an important destination for Vietnamese seeking educational and economic opportunities abroad. However, due to the partition of Vietnam and the isolationism imposed by the North, the vast majority of Vietnamese coming to France during this time were from the South. In 1964, in response to the significant number of Vietnamese students in Paris and lack of representation, the Association Générale des Etudiants Vietnamiens de Paris (AGEVP, General Association for Vietnamese Students of Paris) was founded as the oldest overseas Vietnamese youth association.

After the Fall of Saigon in 1975 and end of the Vietnam War, the majority of Vietnamese refugees to France were settled in Paris and the surrounding Île-de-France metropolitan region. The first wave of these refugees actually consisted of those who were exiled or evacuated shortly before the war ended, and consisted almost entirely of South Vietnamese politicians and their families, including Madame Nhu and Nguyễn Khánh. From this period and into the 1980s, the area of the 13th arrondissement developed into a Little Vietnam, with a commercial district and community institutions created to serve the new Vietnamese immigrants, along with expanded services provided by established organizations such as the AGEVP.

== Demographics ==
As the Institut national de la statistique et des études économiques does not provide race and ethnicity in its census estimates, it is difficult to determine the precise number of French citizens of Vietnamese descent in France and Paris. As of 2018, estimates for the Vietnamese population in Paris place the number at about 70,000. Such a figure places Paris as one of the cities with the largest number of ethnic Vietnamese living outside Vietnam. Furthermore, an additional 100,000 ethnic Vietnamese are estimated to live around the Île-de-France area. This number also puts the region as having the largest number of ethnic Vietnamese in the world outside of Vietnam itself.

Meanwhile, a 2011 estimate counted over 30,000 Vietnamese in Paris who were either permanent French residents born in Vietnam or who were Vietnamese citizens.

== Geographic distribution ==
Unlike other Asian communities in Paris, the Vietnamese community's well-established presence in the city has resulted in the majority of the community being scattered around the city and surrounding suburbs, rather than in ethnic enclaves such as the Chinese or North Africans. For the first decade or so after refugee arrivals began in 1975, the 13th arrondissement and specifically its Quartier Asiatique, was the hub of the Vietnamese community. However, the quick integration of the immigrants due to linguistic and cultural knowledge of the host country led to a suburbanization of the Vietnamese and a movement to wealthier areas of Paris, while still maintaining a significant commercial and cultural presence in the neighborhood.

Besides the 13th arrondissement, significant Vietnamese concentrations are also found in the 18th and 19th arrondissement of Paris. Numerous Vietnamese cultural institutions and Buddhist temples are also found in the 17th arrondissement. In regards to the suburbs of Paris, the communes of Ivry-sur-Seine, Lognes, Torcy, Bussy-Saint-Georges and Les Essarts-le-Roi contain the highest concentrations of Vietnamese in France, with a share of over 20% of each commune's population. Additionally, the commune of Évry is the site of the Khánh Anh Temple (Pagode Khánh-Anh), a Vietnamese Buddhist temple that is also the largest Buddhist place of worship in Europe.

== Media ==
There are a small number of Vietnamese language media broadcasters and newspapers in Paris and the surrounding Île-de-France region, most notably Radio France Internationale, which broadcasts a station in Vietnamese.

Paris has not only played a major role in modern Vietnamese culture, but is also host or the origin city to the entertainment industry serving other overseas Vietnamese communities. The most notable overseas Vietnamese production, Thúy Nga, producer of the popular Vietnamese language variety program Paris by Night, was restructured and headquartered in Paris following its move from South Vietnam post-1975.

== See also ==
- Vietnamese people in France
