= Vietnamese people in France =

Ethnic group

Vietnamese people in France Người Pháp gốc Việt (Vietnamese) Vietnamiens en France (French)
Total population
- ~400,000 (2022); 0.61% of the French population

Regions with significant populations
- Paris and Île-de-France region, Marseille, Lyon, Toulouse, Lille, Bordeaux

Languages
- French (standard and Vietnamese dialect), Vietnamese

Religion
- Vietnamese folk religion, Mahayana Buddhism with elements of Confucianism and Taoism; significant minority Roman Catholicism

Related ethnic groups
- Overseas Vietnamese, Asians in France

Vietnamese people in France (Vietnamese: Người Pháp gốc Việt; French: Diaspora vietnamienne en France) consist of people of full or partial Vietnamese ancestry who were born in or immigrated to France. Their population was about 400,000 as of 2022, making them one of the largest Asian communities in the country.

Unlike other overseas Vietnamese communities in the West, the Vietnamese population in France had already been well-established before the Fall of Saigon and the resulting diaspora. They make up over half of the Vietnamese population in Europe.

== History ==
=== Before 1954 ===
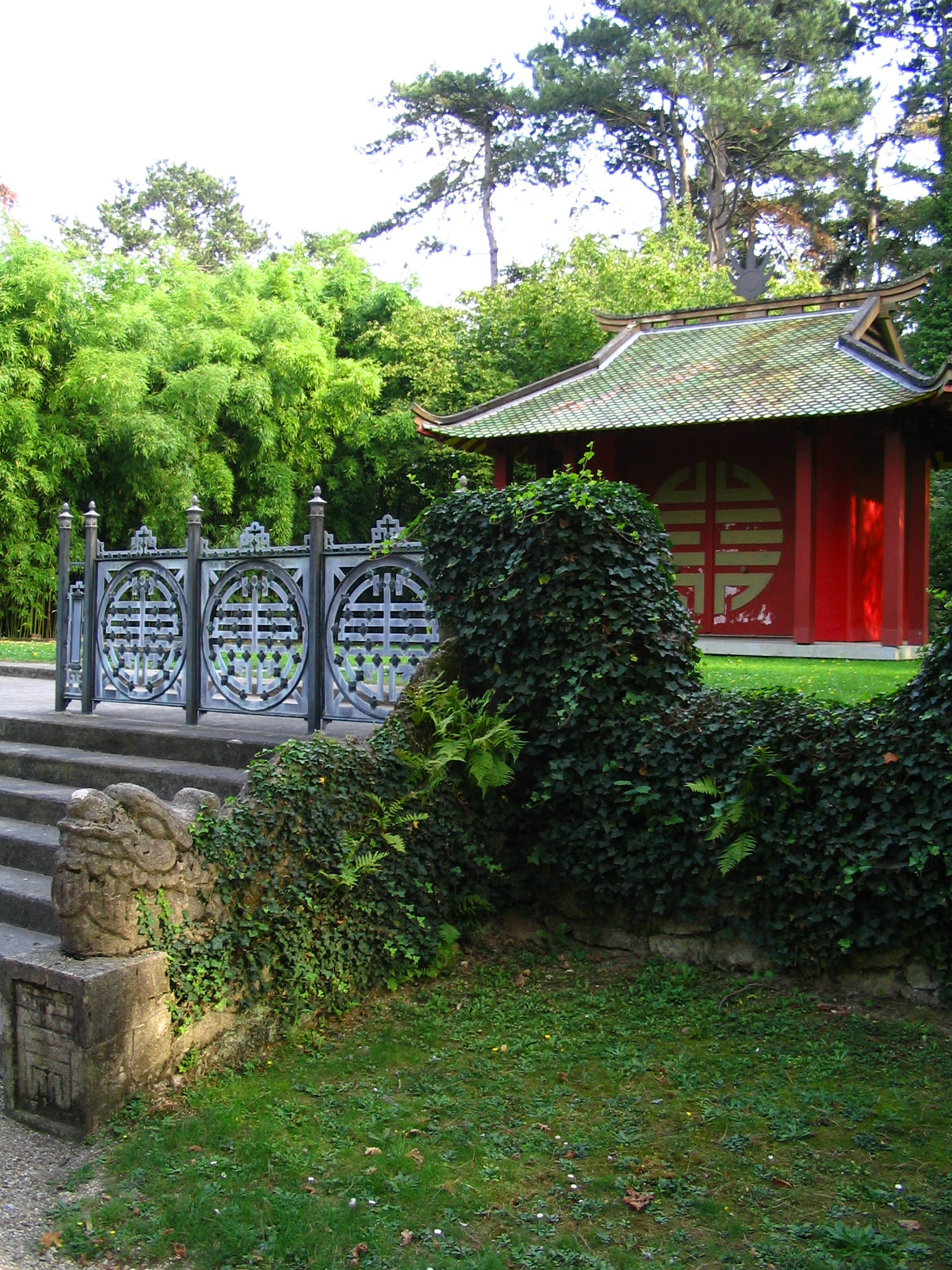
Temple du Souvenir Indochinois

France was the first Western country in which Vietnamese migrants settled due to the colonization of Vietnam by France. The French assistance to Nguyễn Ánh in 1777 was one of earliest formal political relations between the two nations. Despite continued French Catholic missions, trade and military assistance to Vietnam throughout the rest of the 18th century and 19th century, Vietnam did not become a colony of France until the Cochinchina Campaign in the late 1850s and Vietnamese immigration consisted of a mere trickle of mostly diplomats.

During the colonial period, there was a significant representation of Vietnamese students in France, which largely consisted of members from the elite class and royal household, primarily from Cochinchina. Professional and blue-collar workers, mostly from Tonkin, also migrated from Vietnam during this period, with some settling permanently. One of the few monuments dating back to these earliest waves of Vietnamese arriving in France is the Temple du Souvenir Indochinois, originally erected in 1907 and subsequently relocated to the Jardin tropical de Paris in the Bois de Vincennes.

The onset of World War I and World War II saw the French Empire recruit soldiers and locals of its colonies to volunteer with the war effort in Metropolitan France. Roughly 50,000 and 20,000 Vietnamese migrated to France during these periods respectively. The wave of migrants who came during World War I was the first major presence of Vietnamese people in France. While many migrants returned to Vietnam following the war, a significant number resettled in France to work as factory workers, railroad builders, artists, and service workers, primarily in Paris and the surrounding Île-de-France region, as well as in Lille.

By 1939, there were an estimated 93,000 French residents of Vietnamese descent, largely consisting of workers and soldiers, as well as students. During the interwar period, a Vietnamese community began to be concentrated in Marseille in southern France. Vietnamese-owned rice farms were also established in southeastern France, and second and third-generation French Vietnamese started to run their own commercial firms or work in professional sectors.

=== 1954 to 1975 ===
Following the Geneva Accords, which granted Vietnam its independence from France, a number of Vietnamese loyal to the colonial government and Vietnamese married to French colonists emigrated to France. Hundreds of families who were evacuated out of Vietnam by the French government were largely settled in makeshift camps in the southwest of France. The most notable was in Sainte-Livrade-sur-Lot near Bordeaux, which hosted the Centre d'Accueil des Français d'Indochine (Reception Center for the French of Indochina). Most of these camps were structured in a similar layout as a traditional town in Vietnam, with a Buddhist temple, markets, schools and medical facilities.

During the 1950s to the 1970s, including the Vietnam War, a number of students from South Vietnam continued to arrive in France, as well as members of the middle class involved in commerce. Although many initially returned home, as the war situation worsened, a majority decided to resettle permanently in France and brought their families along. It was during this period that Vietnamese community institutions were established to better serve both new immigrants and expatriates, as well as established generations of Vietnamese in France. France officially recognized the Democratic Republic of Vietnam (North Vietnam) on 12 April 1973, following the Paris Peace Accords.

=== After 1975 ===
The largest influx of Vietnamese people arrived in France as refugees after the Fall of Saigon and end of the Vietnam War in 1975. Early Vietnamese refugees who settled in France largely consisted of professionals who made up the middle class and elite in South Vietnam, along with those with high levels of education and those with family already present in the country. Larger waves of refugees later included South Vietnamese from different social standings, although their average level of education and affluence was still higher than their peers who settled in North America, Australia, and the rest of Europe.

France received the third highest number of refugees from Vietnam after the United States and Australia, numbering over 100,000 between 1975 and 1990. By the beginning of the 1990s, refugees had accounted for slightly over three-quarters of the Vietnamese population in France. Despite the community already being numerous before the refugee arrival, the Vietnamese American community soon surpassed its counterpart in France as the largest overseas Vietnamese population due to the much higher number of refugees resettling there.

Furthermore, Vietnamese refugees who arrived in France largely had the intent to request asylum in the country, unlike their counterparts who migrated to other Western countries, who made desperate attempts to be permitted resettlement anywhere possible, especially in the United States. The last of Vietnamese refugees arrived in the mid-1990s, when the remaining refugee camps closed.

== Culture and demographics ==
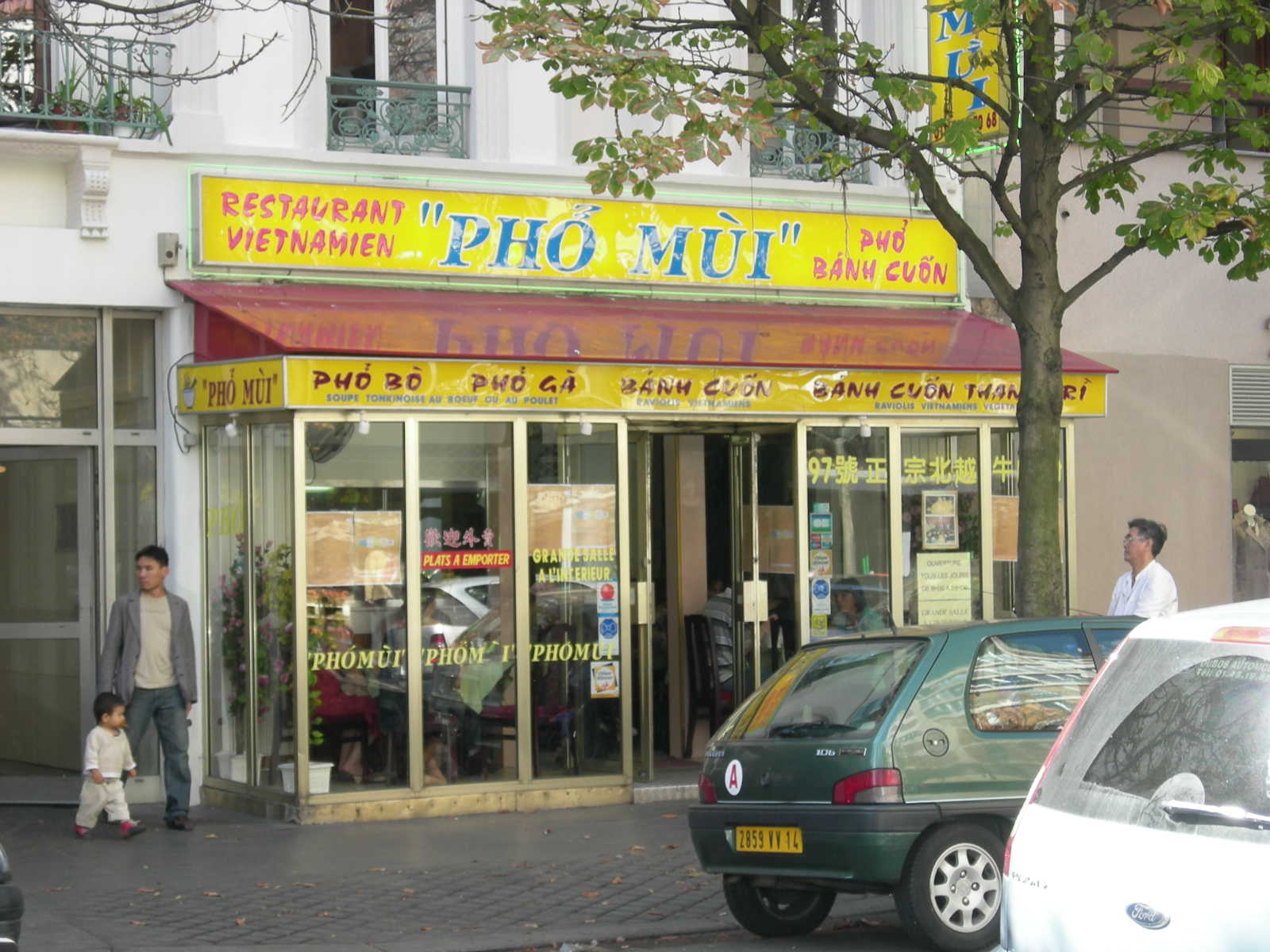
A pho restaurant in the Paris Quartier asiatique neighborhood

Slightly more than half of the Vietnamese population in France live in Paris (especially in the 13th, 18th and 19th arrondissements) and the surrounding Île-de-France area, while a sizable number also reside in the major urban centers in the south-east of the country, primarily Marseille and Lyon, as well as in Toulouse. Earlier Vietnamese migrants also settled in the cities of Lille and Bordeaux.

Reflecting the community's long history in the country, first-generation immigrants form about over a third of the ethnic Vietnamese population in France, with about 128,000 individuals born in Vietnam as of 2012. This is in contrast to other overseas Vietnamese communities outside Southeast Asia, where the immigrant generation forms half or more of the Vietnamese population.

Unlike their counterparts in North America or Australia, the Vietnamese have not formed distinct enclaves within the major cities of France (although many Vietnamese-based shops and cultural institutions can be found in the Quartier asiatique neighborhood of Paris' 13th arrondissement) and the degree of assimilation is higher than in the United States, Canada, or Australia, due to better cultural, historical, and linguistic knowledge of the host country.

The community is still strongly attached to its homeland while being well-integrated in the French society. Unlike Canada, the United States, or other European countries, the educational system in France does not emphasise a multicultural society. As a result, even though the generation of Vietnamese immigrants to France continues to hold onto traditional culture and values, later generations of French-born Vietnamese strongly identify with the French culture rather than the Vietnamese one. First or second generations born in France know very little about the country of their ancestors and often do not use Vietnamese, although cultural organizations and institutions are present to serve these groups of French Vietnamese. Fourth and later generations of French Vietnamese have largely blended into French society culturally, and have high rates of intermarriage with the ethnic French population.

Vietnamese is the eighth most spoken language of immigrant origin and most spoken Asian language in France. However, a large number of French-born Vietnamese are unable to speak and/or understand it. Nevertheless, there has been an increase in Vietnamese-language schools serving both the community and local French in recent years.

A majority of Vietnamese in France observe Mahayana Buddhism, with influences from Taoism and Confucian thought also present. Buddhist temples have played important roles in the community, helping to serve immigrant needs as well as forming a base for cultural and youth organizations for the generations of French-born Vietnamese. Slightly over a quarter of Vietnamese in France profess to Roman Catholicism, often attending church services in French, rather than forming ethnic specific churches.

Holidays observed by the Vietnamese in France include Tết, Vu Lan, and the Mid-Autumn Festival. In addition, those who support the Hanoi government also commemorate International Women's Day, Vietnamese Reunification Day, and Vietnamese National Day.

== Socioeconomics ==
The level of integration among immigrants and their place in French society have become prominent issues in France in the past decade. French media and politicians generally view the Vietnamese community as a model minority, in part because they are represented as having a high degree of integration within the French society as well as economic and academic success. A survey in 1988 among French citizens placed the Vietnamese in fourth place as the most integrated immigrant group in the country, behind the Italian, Spanish and Portuguese communities.

Furthermore, Vietnamese in France on average have a high level of education attainment. French students of Vietnamese descent are also more successful than students of Vietnamese descent among other Overseas Vietnamese communities, having had a longer establishment and higher rates of success at the secondary and higher levels, while students in the latter group have only recently begun being represented as successful in the education system of their community's host nation.

== Politics ==
In the early 1980s, the rate of naturalization of Vietnamese in France was 5%, among the highest rates for immigrants in France (compared with about 0.25% for Algerians, the largest immigrant community). The 1999 census showed that about 75% of those who held Vietnamese nationality received French citizenship.

Despite having high rates of naturalization, the Vietnamese rarely follow French politics, having low participation rates in local and national elections. The generation of refugees from the Vietnam War usually become French citizens for economic rather than political reasons. While they do not follow French politics, they follow Vietnamese politics closely and in the past played pivotal roles in the Vietnamese political landscape in the early 20th century.

The Vietnamese community in France is divided into two opposing camps: those supporting the communist Hanoi government and those who are anticommunists. Almost all organisations in the community, including religious and commercial entities, fall in one of the two camps. This division in the community has been present since the 1950s, when Vietnamese students and workers in France supported and praised the Vietminh's policies back home, while Vietnamese loyal to the colonial government and fled to France were largely anti-communist. This political rift remained minor until the Fall of Saigon in 1975, when staunchly anti-communist refugees from South Vietnam arrived and established community networks and institutions. Today, Vietnamese in France are divided between those who support the Hanoi government, who self-identify as "immigrants", and those who are anticommunists, who self-identify as "refugees". The two camps have contradictory political goals and members of one group rarely interact with members of the other group. Such political divisions, especially the presence of a pro-Hanoi faction, have prevented the Vietnamese in France from forming a strong, unified community in their host nation as their counterparts have in North America and Australia.

=== Supporters of the Vietnamese government ===
Those who support the Vietnamese government coalesce under the umbrella group Union Générale des Vietnamiens de France (UGVF). UGVF is well-organised and is recognised by the government of Vietnam. A majority of the group's members consist of those who arrived in France prior to 1975 and their descendants, and they tend to have more stable economic conditions. Many UGVF members are also members of the French Communist Party, while some are members of the Communist Party of Vietnam.

Prior to 1975, the goal of UGVF was to advocate for an end to the Vietnam War and to provide support to the Hanoi government. After the communist victory in 1975, many UGVF members planned to repatriate to help rebuild the country, but they were viewed as a threat by the government due to their Western background. Those who were trained in the Soviet Union were viewed more favorably because they were considered to have more palatable political views. Upon their return to Vietnam, the Vietnamese from France could not find jobs comparable to those they held in France. From then on, they have advocated for the formation of a permanent expatriate community in France. Their goals have also changed to maintaining Vietnamese culture among the later generations. The French government considers UGVF a communist organization and their political activities were clandestine until 1981, when they were recognised by the Socialist government.

UGVF organises many festivals for major Vietnamese holidays such as Tết and the Mid-Autumn Festival. These events always include the presence of the Vietnamese ambassador to France. UGVF members have also created many other organisations to compete with the anti-communist groups for the support of the post-1975 refugees within the community. However, these organisations do not clearly state their affiliation with UGVF because many refugees will stop supporting them if they learn about the connections.

While UGVF is not a front for Vietnamese communists in France, its political outlook is closely aligned with the Vietnamese government. Some French-born UGVF members have seen it as being too dependent on Hanoi and have started domestic activist movements, such as fighting against discrimination.

=== Anticommunists ===
Unlike the Hanoi supporters, the anticommunists do not unite under any single nationwide group, but they share the same view of opposing the communist regime in Vietnam. Prior to 1975, there were very few anticommunist groups operating in France, with members largely consisting of those loyal to the colonial government who fled to France following Vietnam's independence led by the Vietminh or South Vietnamese students and expatriates. The most significant of these groups is the Association Générale des Etudiants Vietnamiens de Paris (AGEVP), founded by South Vietnamese students studying in the 1960s to address a lack of university and cultural representation for Vietnamese students in Paris. After 1975, with the arrival of boat people refugees in large numbers, their activities dramatically increased. While the economic situation of the first generation of refugees is less stable and the group is not as organised as UGVF, their descendants and pre-Vietnam War anticommunist community members in the Paris region have organized under the AGEVP.

Although UGVF seeks to portray the Vietnamese community in France as a united community supportive of the government, the anticommunist groups seek to inform mainstream French that there are fundamental differences in political views among the community. They often stage protests against the Vietnamese government, often advocating boycotts against businesses with ties to UGVF.

== Vietnamese in other French territories ==
=== New Caledonia ===
There are official reports of much smaller populations of Vietnamese in other territories of France. The most notable are the Chân Dăng of New Caledonia, descendants of Vietnamese contract laborers and prisoners recruited to work the nickel mines of the Pacific island during the 1890s to early 1950s. Many laborers returned to Vietnam after their contract expired, while prisoners were repatriated back to their homeland as free citizens. However, a significant number of workers decided to remain on the island after their contracts expired. By the time Vietnam gained its independence from France in 1954, Vietnamese had formed about 6% of New Caledonia's population.

Following Vietnam's independence, most Chân Dăng were stateless people while France negotiated with the governments of North and South Vietnam to repatriate back laborers. Although the vast majority of Vietnamese in New Caledonia originated from northern Vietnam, in 1957 the French government agreed to return ethnic Vietnamese who did not have permanent residency in New Caledonia (a French territory) to South Vietnam, which it had a better political relationship with. This created protests among the Vietnamese, who desired to return to their native region and petitioned to the Hanoi government to send delegates to New Caledonia for negotiation. After two and a half years of talks with the North Vietnamese government, France eventually agreed to send back Chân Dăng to northern Vietnam. Over 4,000 laborers returned during the mid-1960s, while about 2,000 Vietnamese remained in New Caledonia. As of 2014, the Vietnamese population in New Caledonia was 2,506, with members being heavily involved in commerce and the service industry.

=== Other territories ===
==== French Guiana ====
In French Guiana, a small Vietnamese community originating from the refugee waves of the Vietnam War is found alongside a much larger Hmong population, of which some members originate from Vietnam. Vietnamese residents in French Guiana arrived as part of the refugee movements following the Vietnam War, often after spending time in refugee camps in Asia. Although relatively small, the community contributes to the multicultural composition of the territory and reflects broader patterns of refugee resettlement in French overseas regions.

==== French Polynesia ====
In French Polynesia, a small Vietnamese community forms part of the Asian community that is a minor percentage of the population, largely consisting of descendants of laborers from the early 20th century or refugees from the Vietnam War. The Vietnamese presence in French Polynesia originates partly from early 20th century colonial labor recruitment, when workers from French Indochina were brought to the Pacific region, as well as from later refugee arrivals after the Vietnam War. These historical migration patterns contributed to the formation of a small, but culturally significant Vietnamese community within the broader Asian population.

== Notable individuals ==
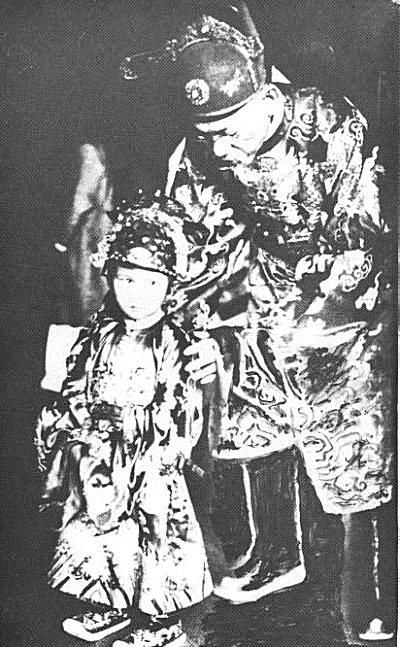
Bảo Long

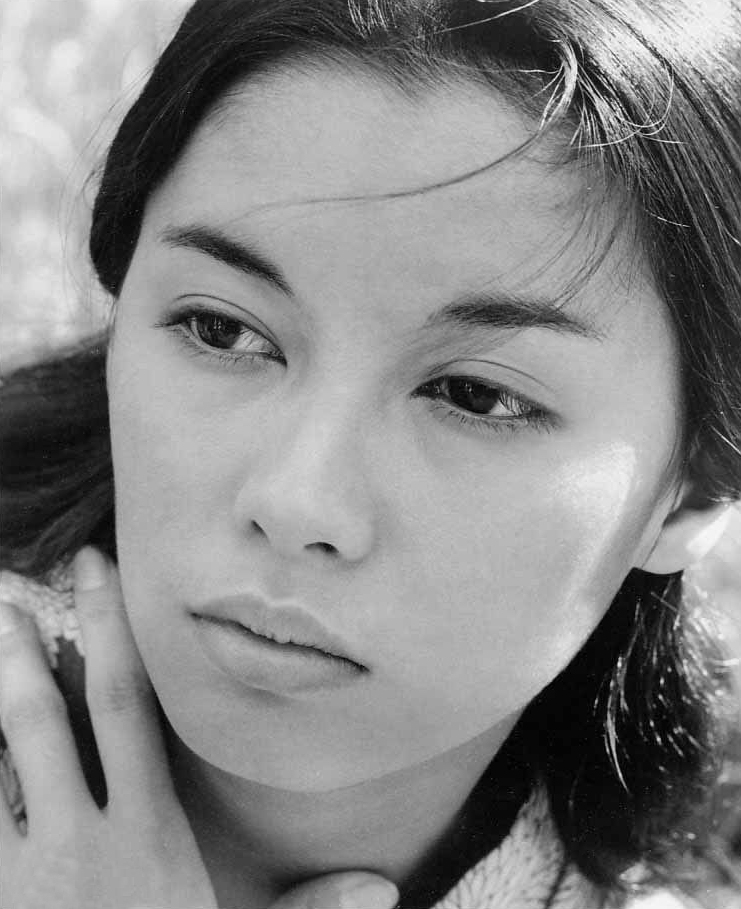
France Nuyen

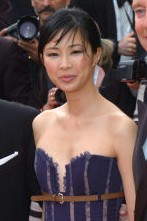
Linh Dan Pham

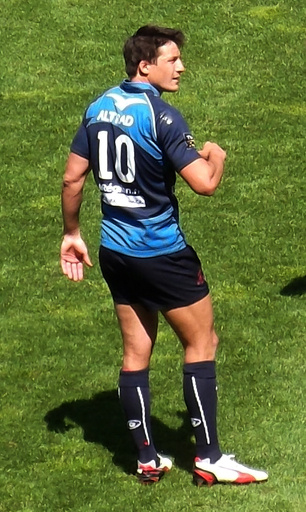
François Trinh-Duc

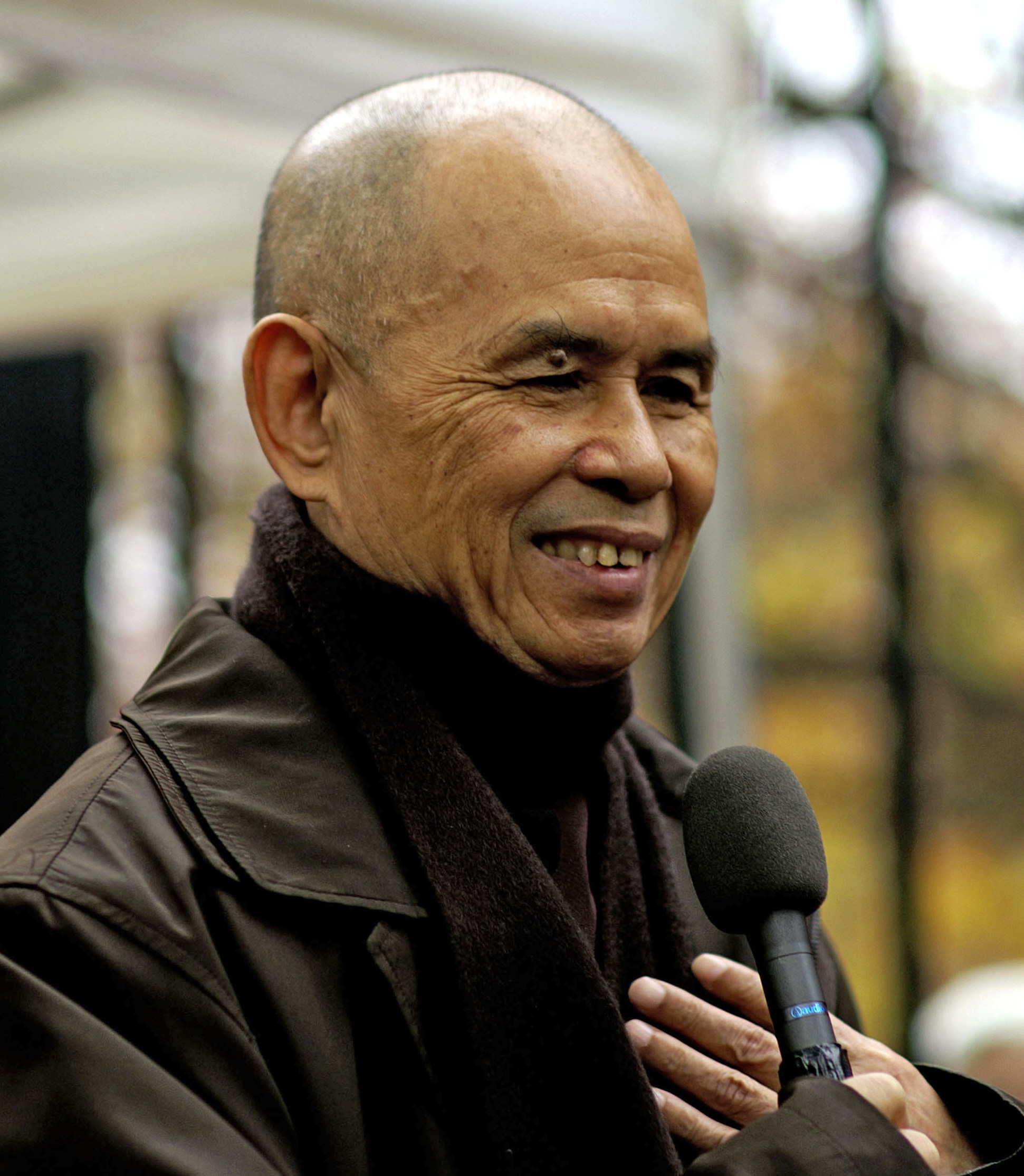
Thích Nhất Hạnh

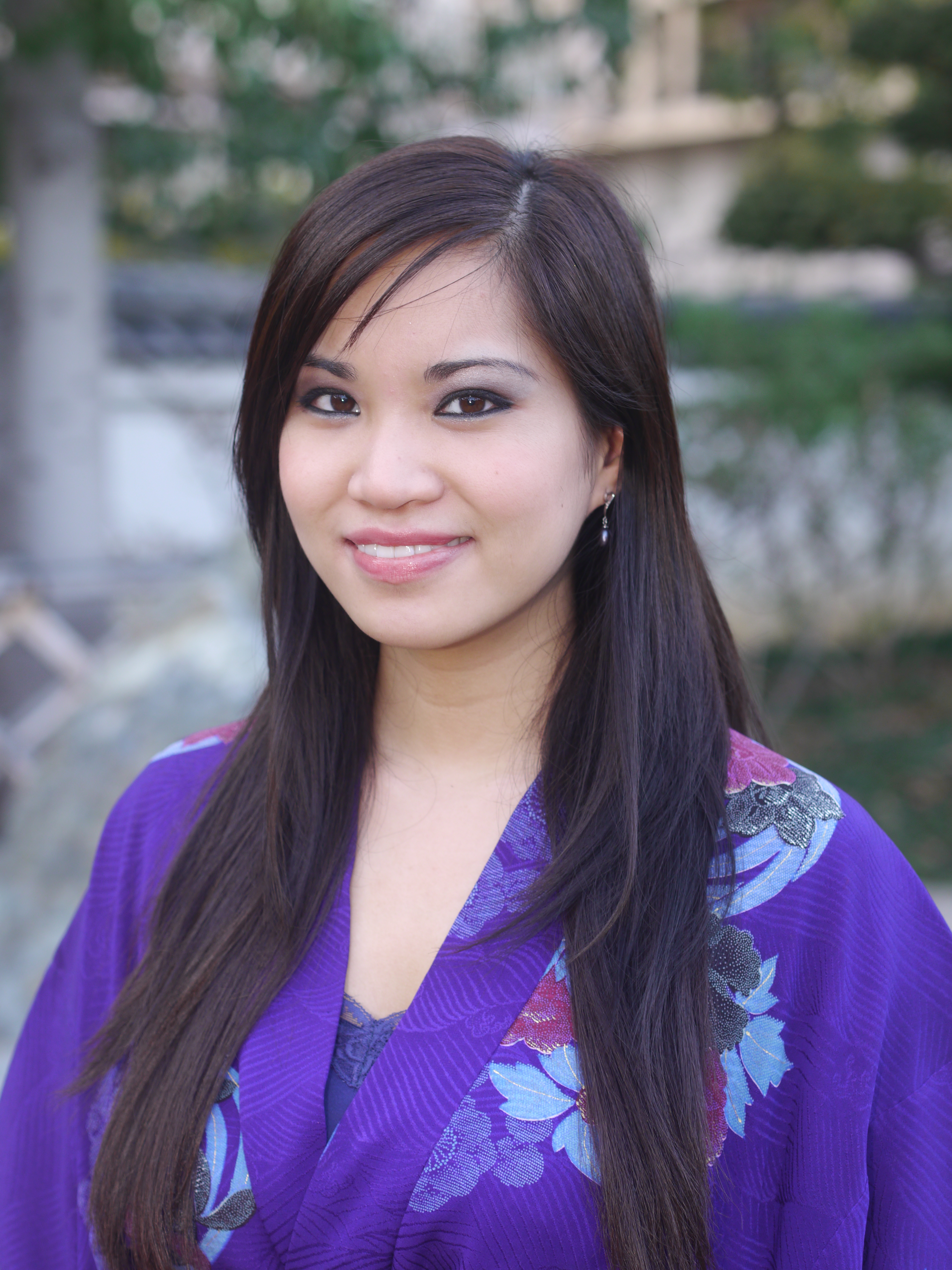
Kayane

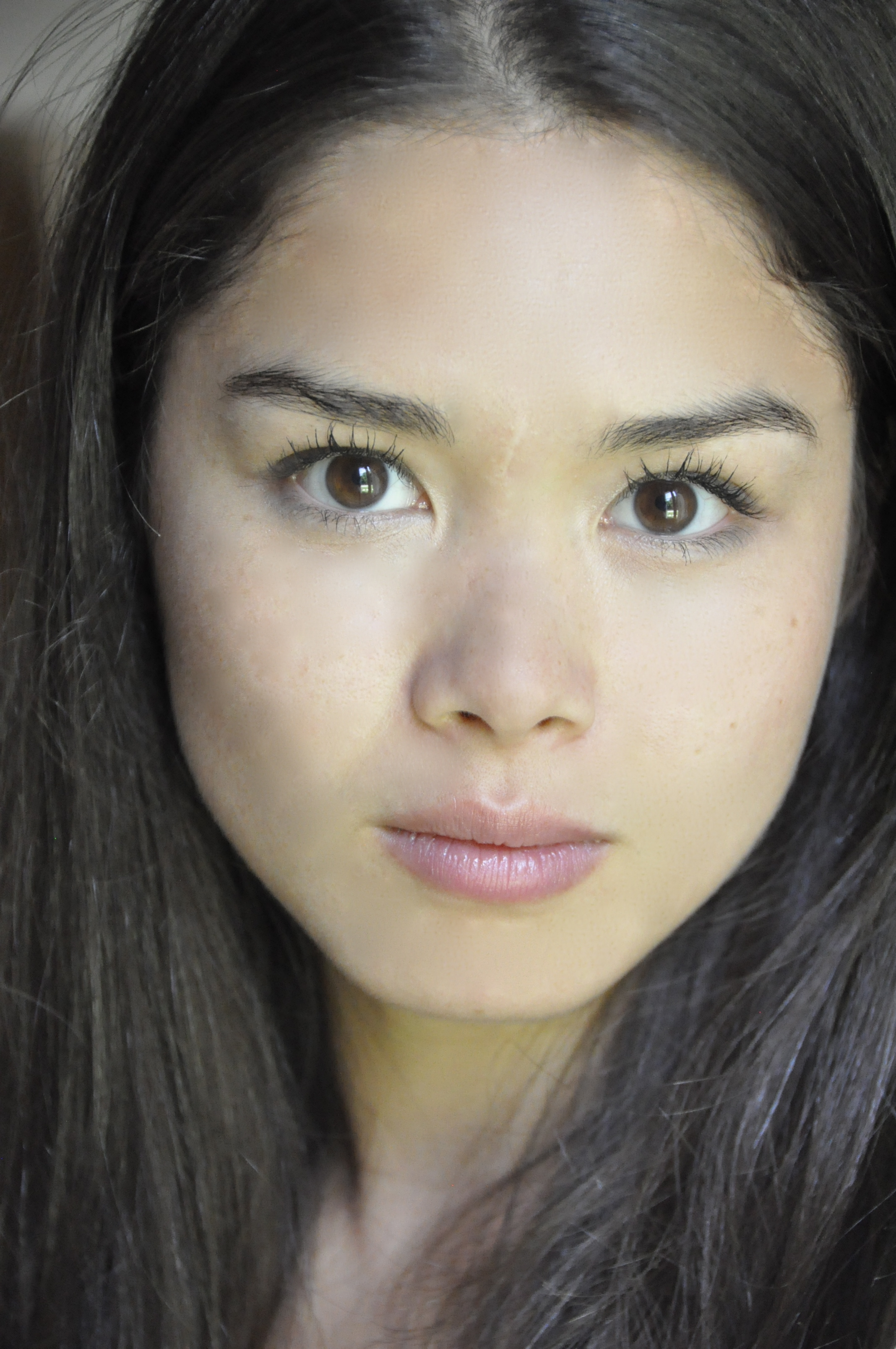
Audrey Giacomini

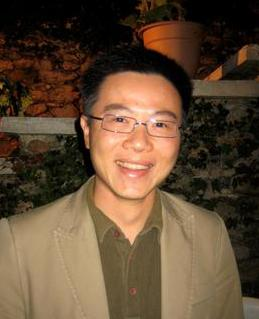
Ngô Bảo Châu

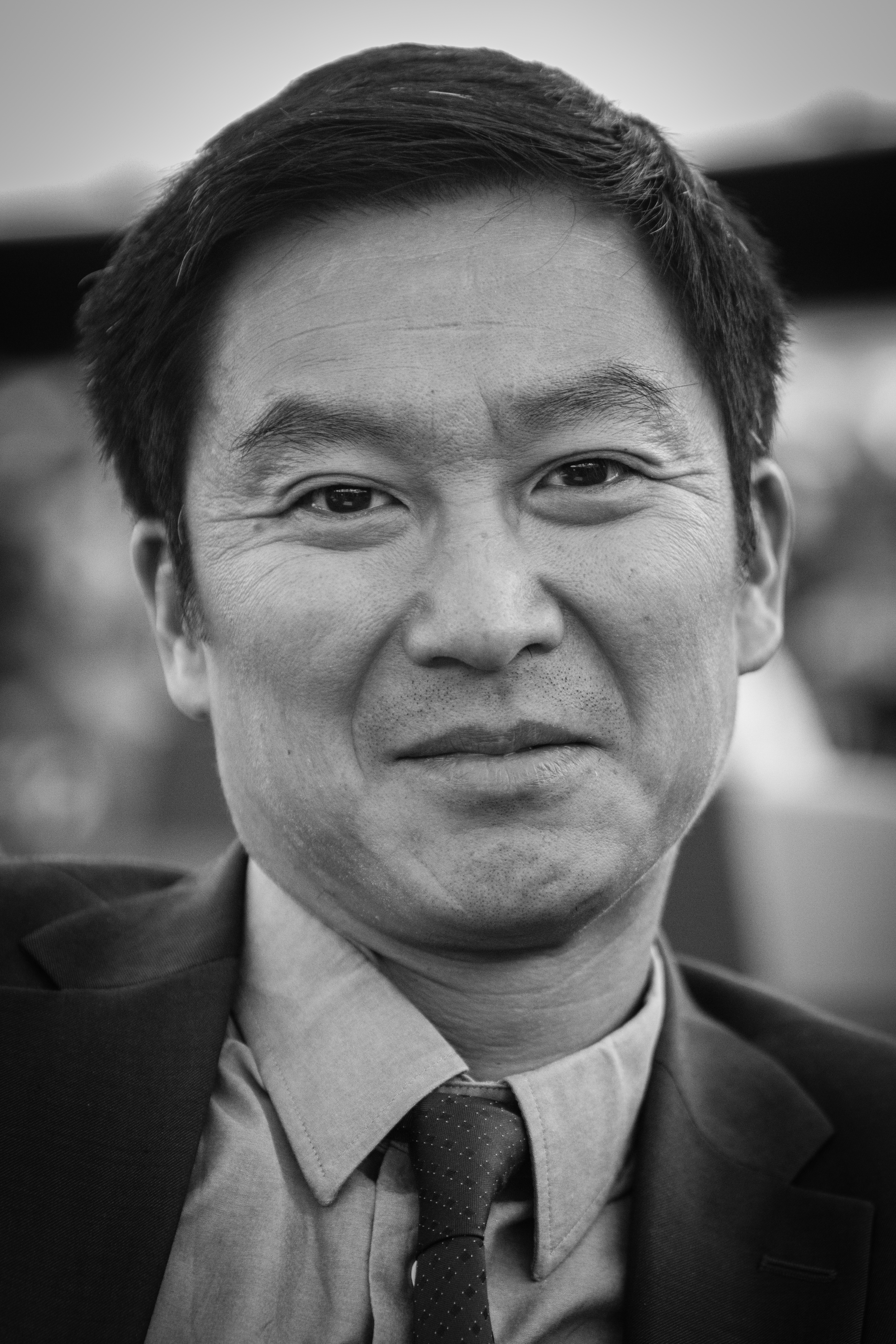
Liêm Hoang Ngoc

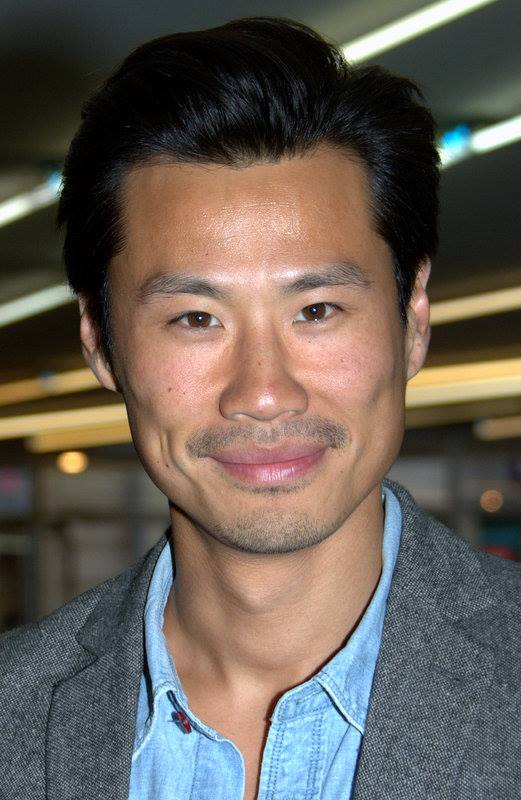
Frédéric Chau

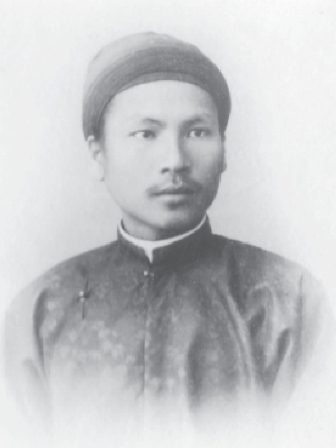
Hàm Nghi

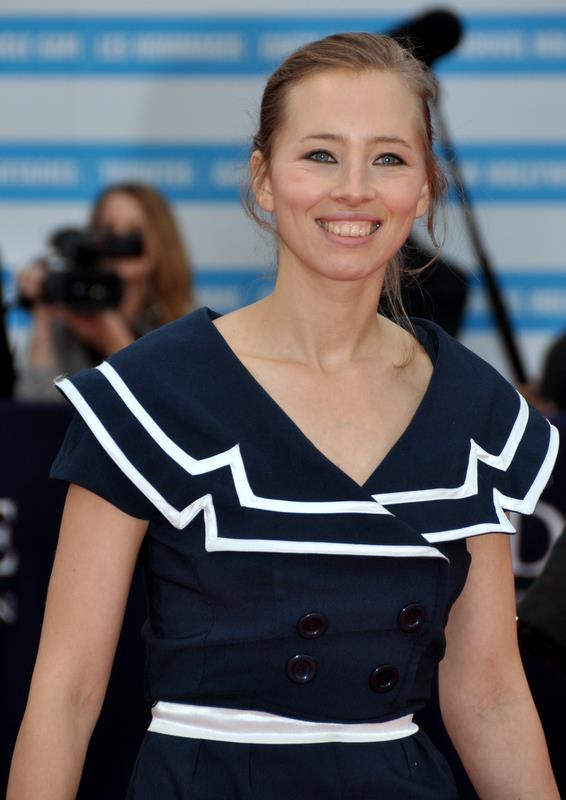
Isild Le Besco

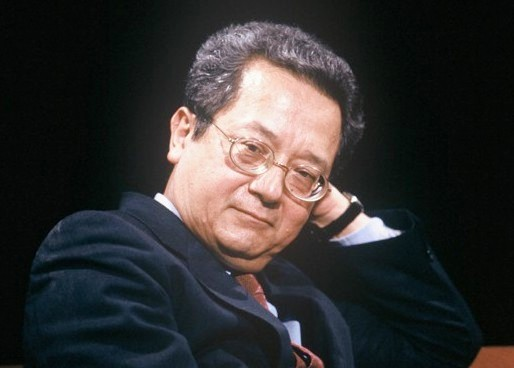
Jacques Vergès

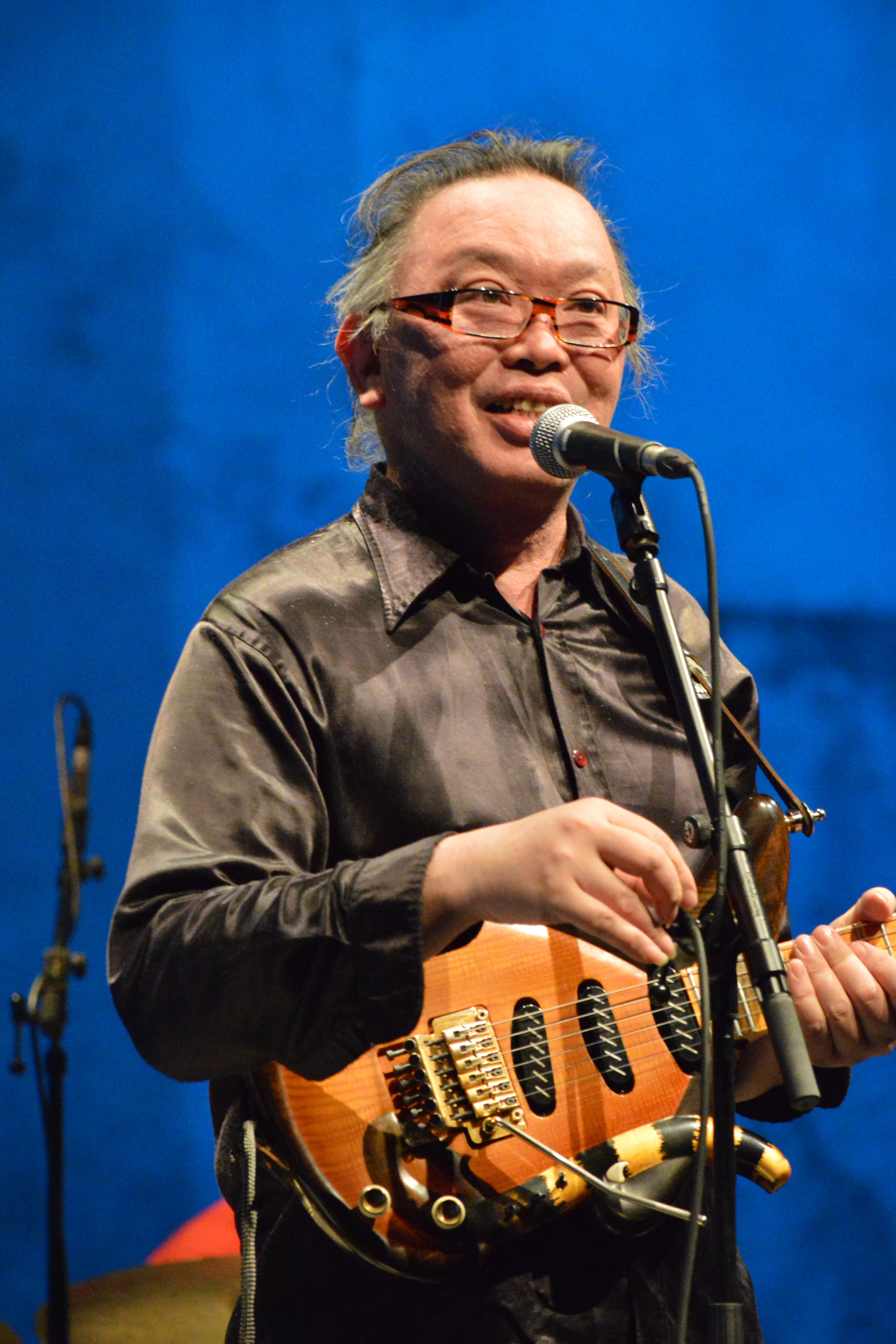
Nguyên Lê

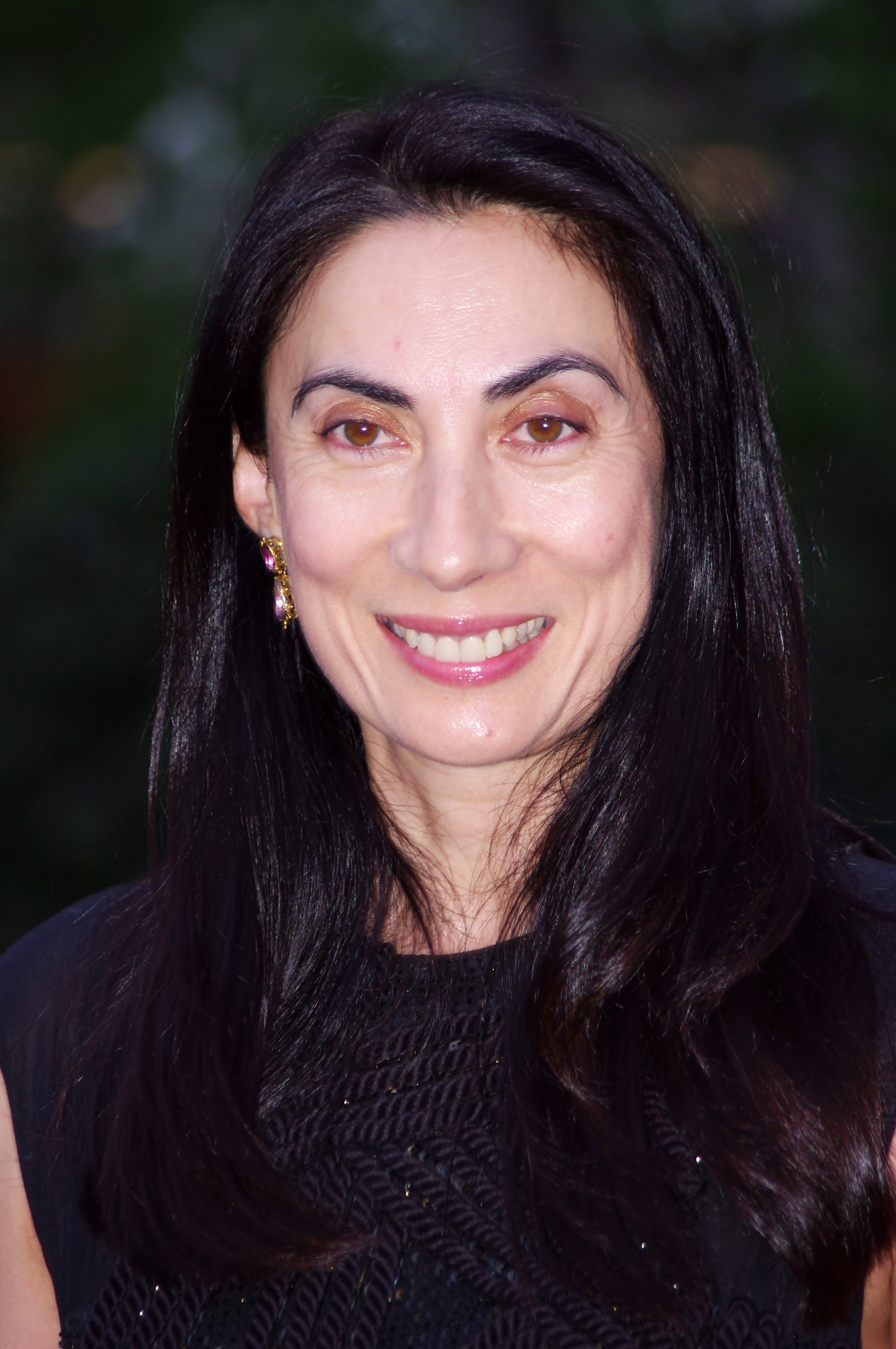
Anh Duong

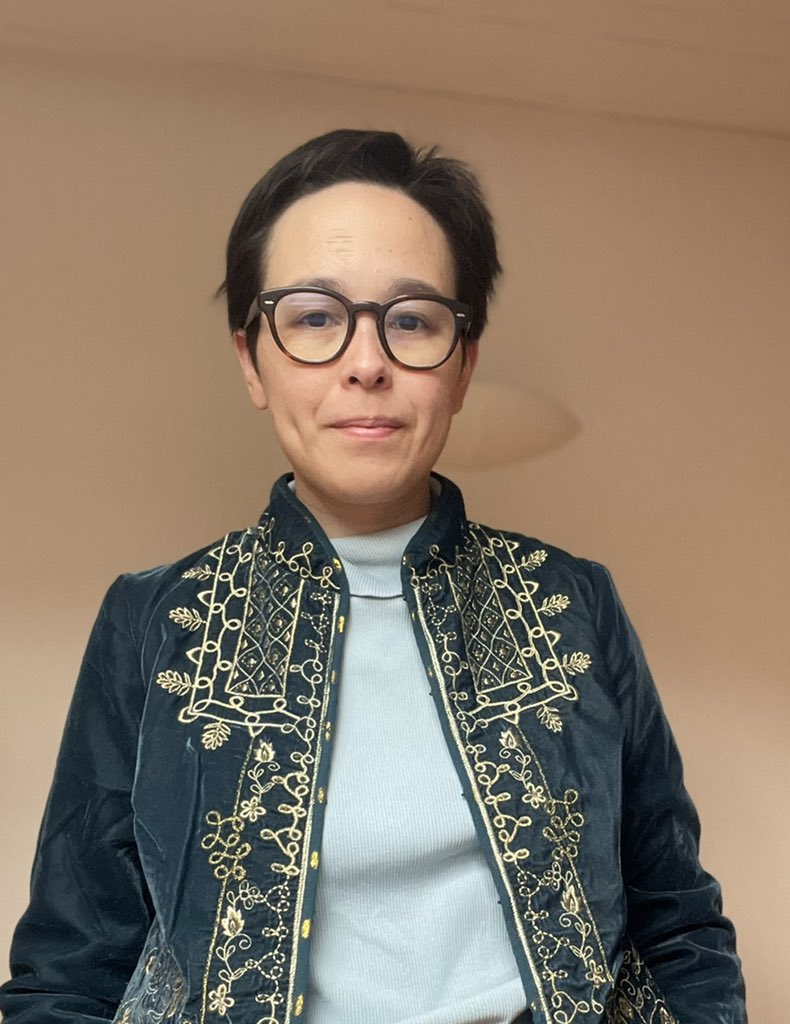
Aliette de Bodard

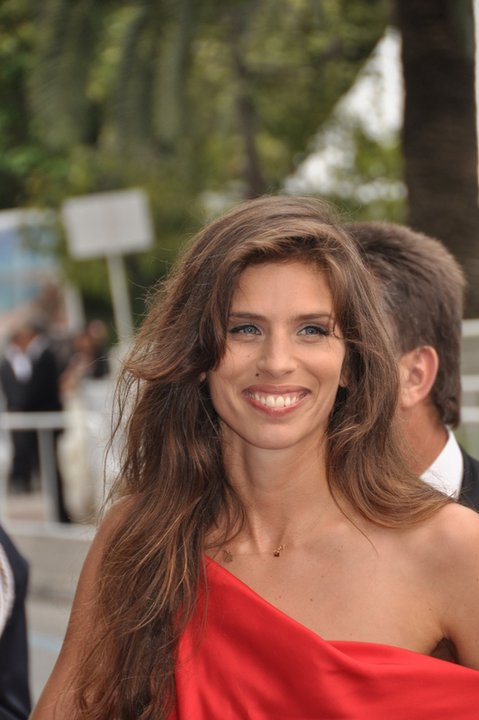
Maïwenn

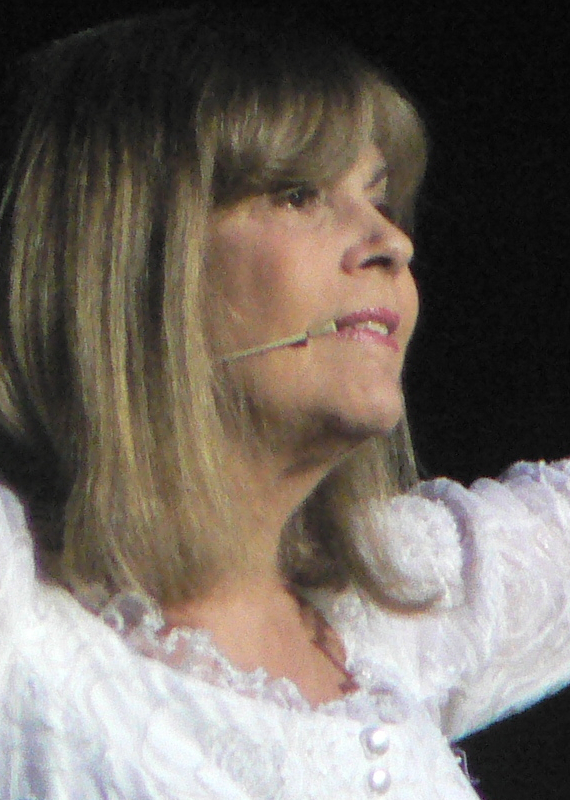
Chantal Goya

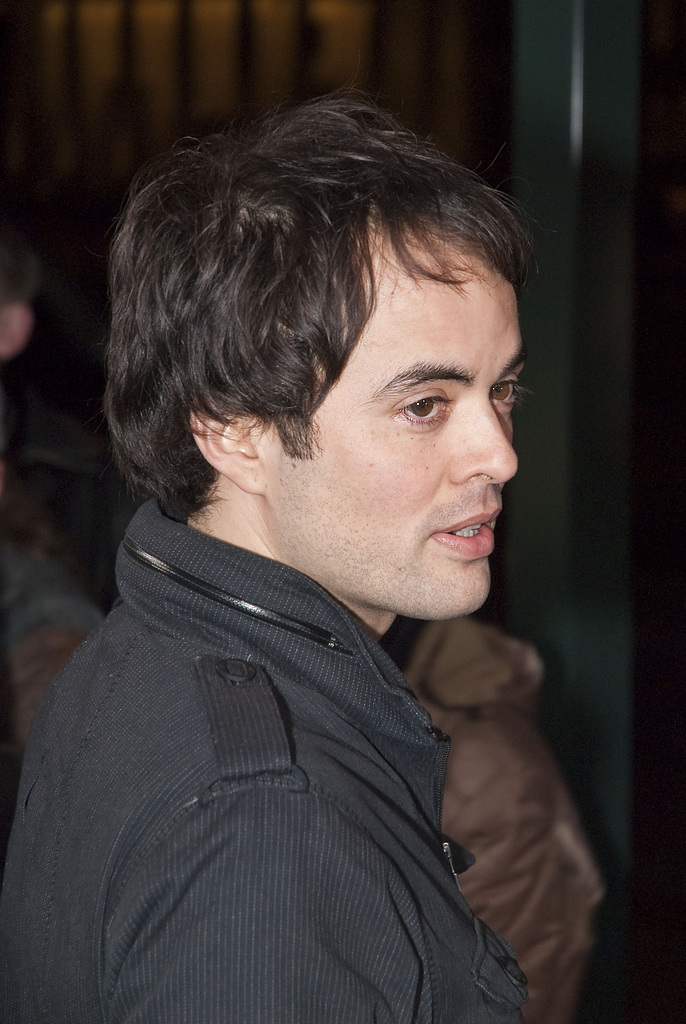
Nikolai Kinski

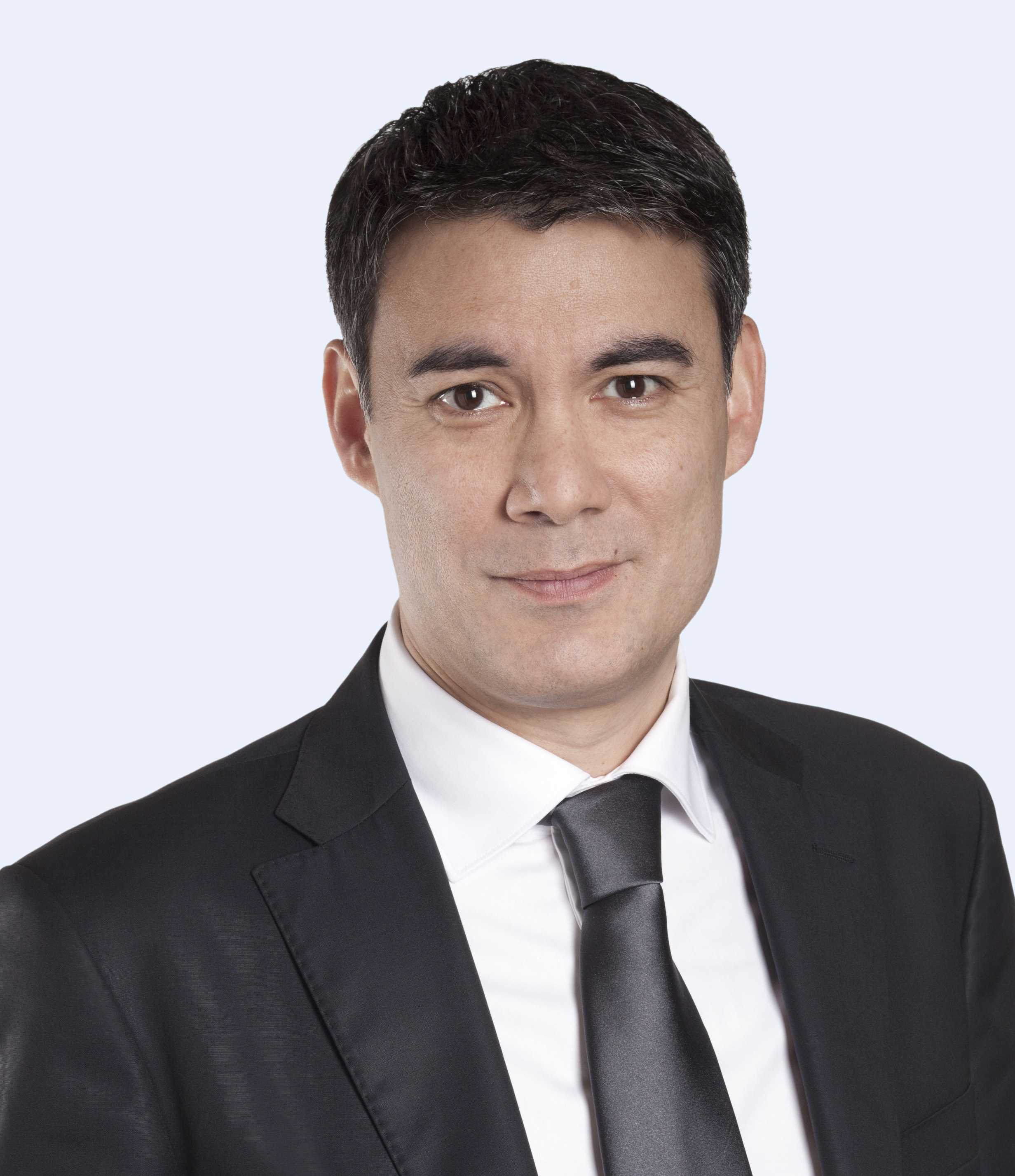
Olivier Faure

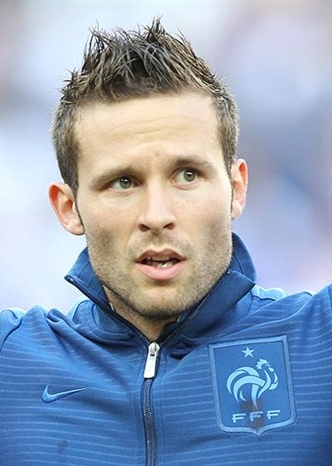
Yohan Cabaye

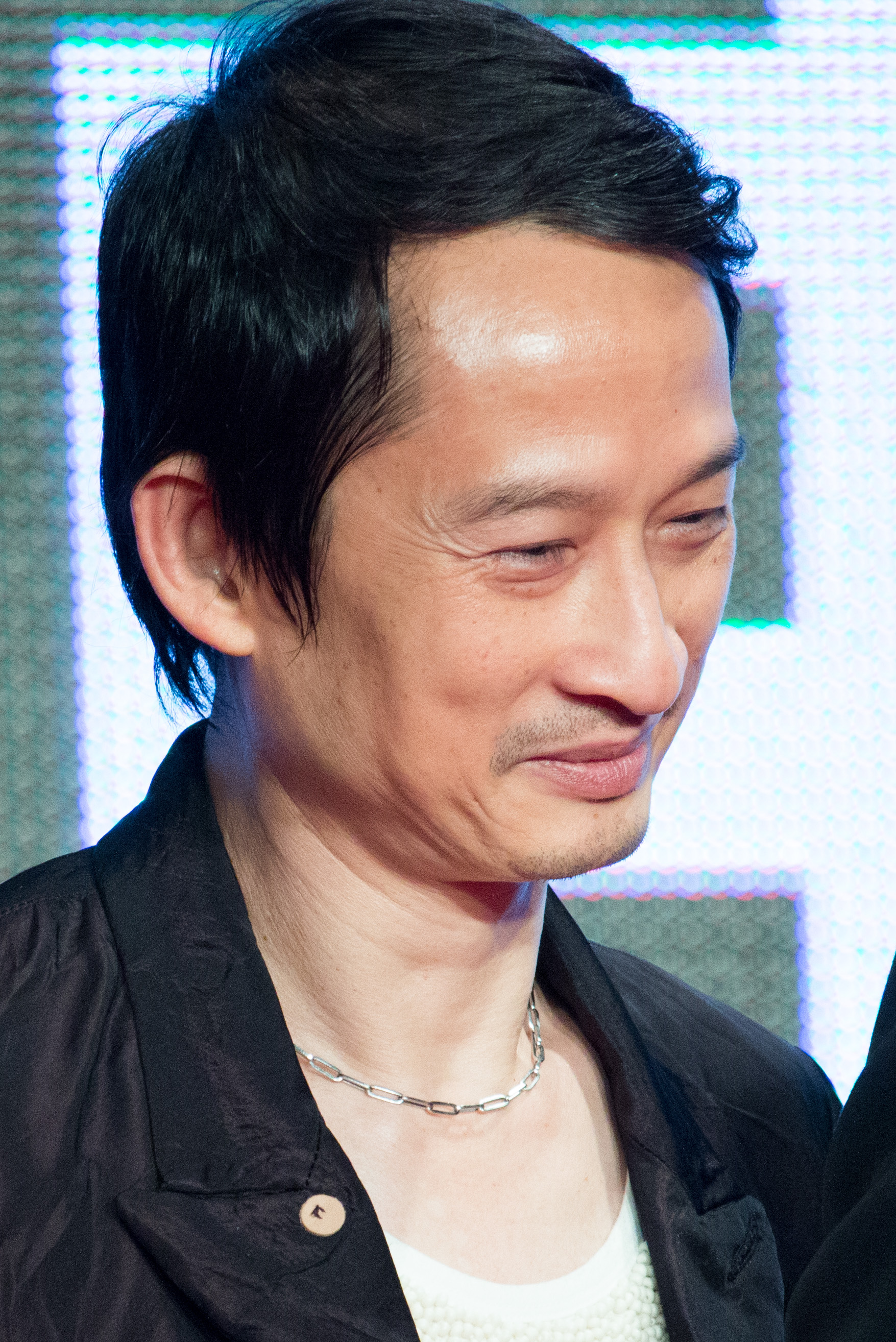
Tran Anh Hung

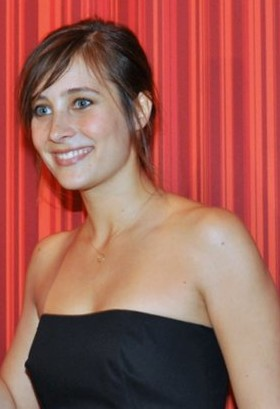
Julie de Bona

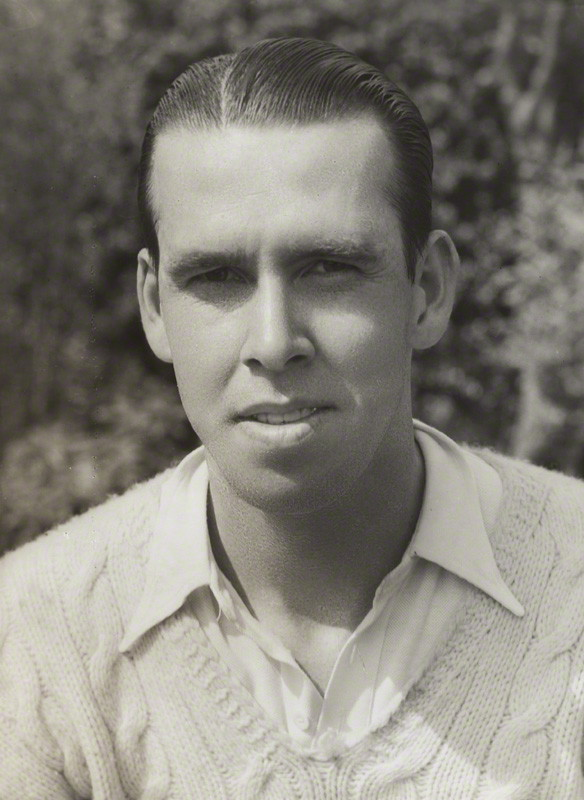
Yvon Petra

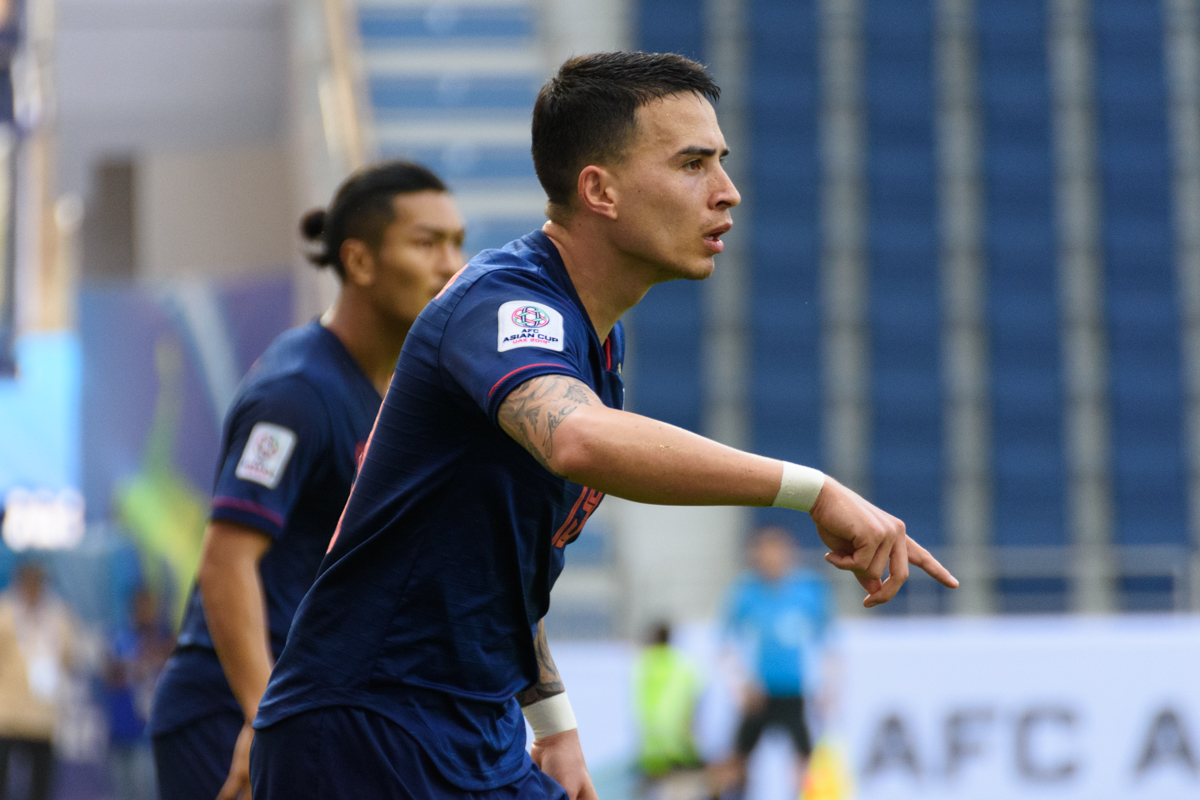
Tristan Do

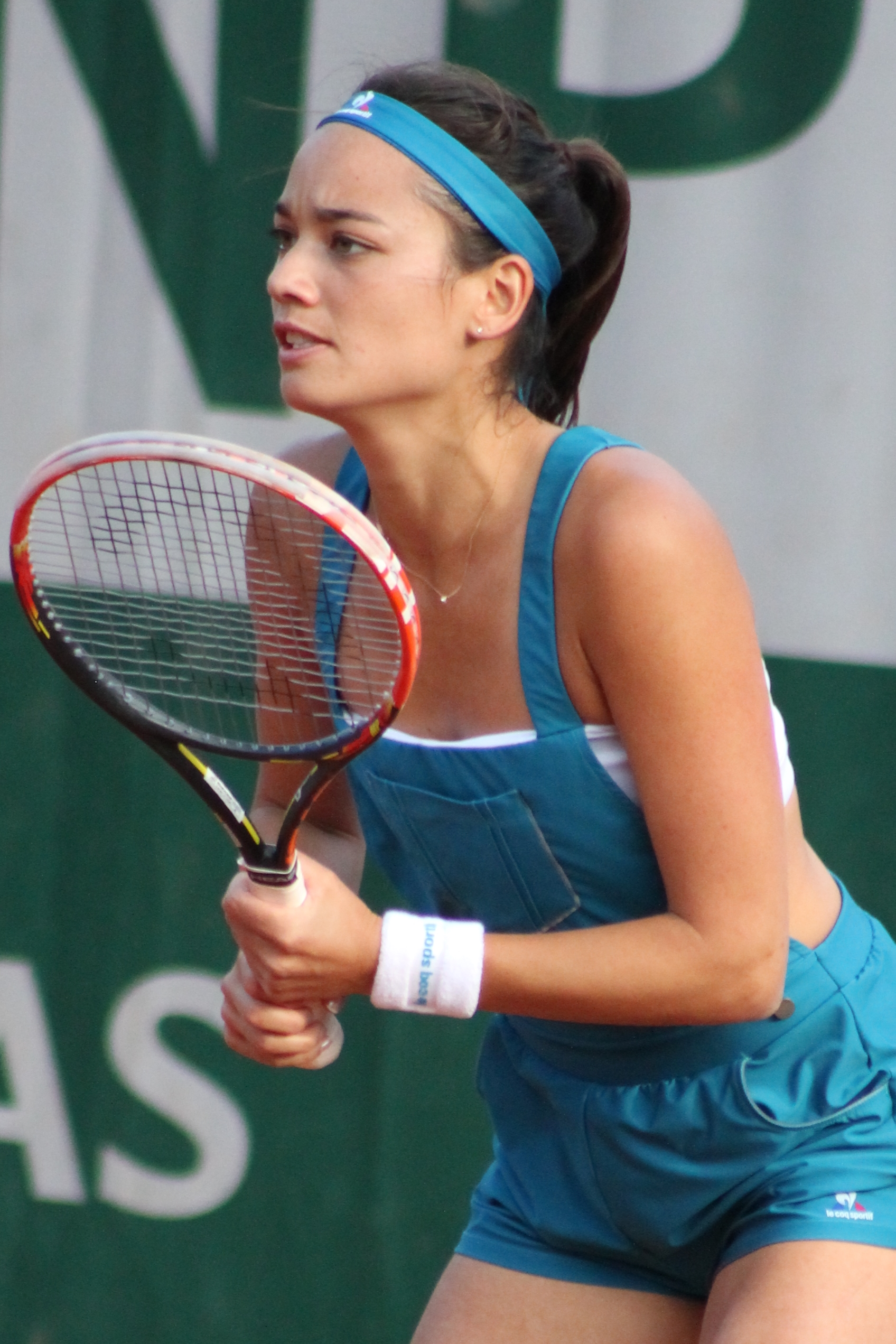
Alizé Lim

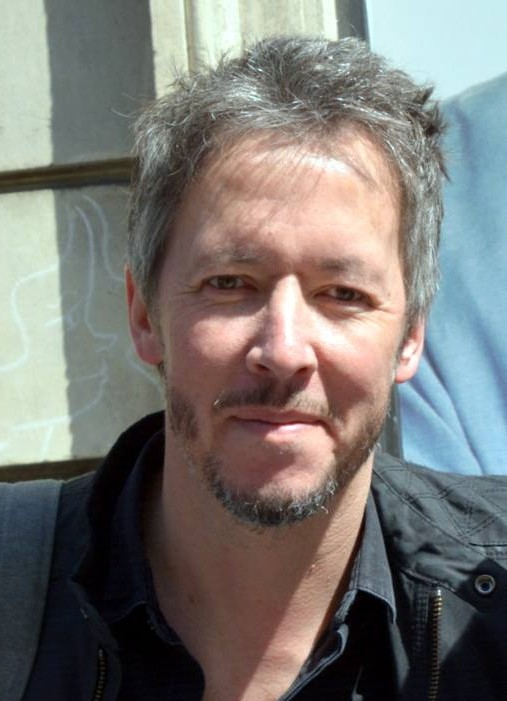
Jean-Luc Lemoine

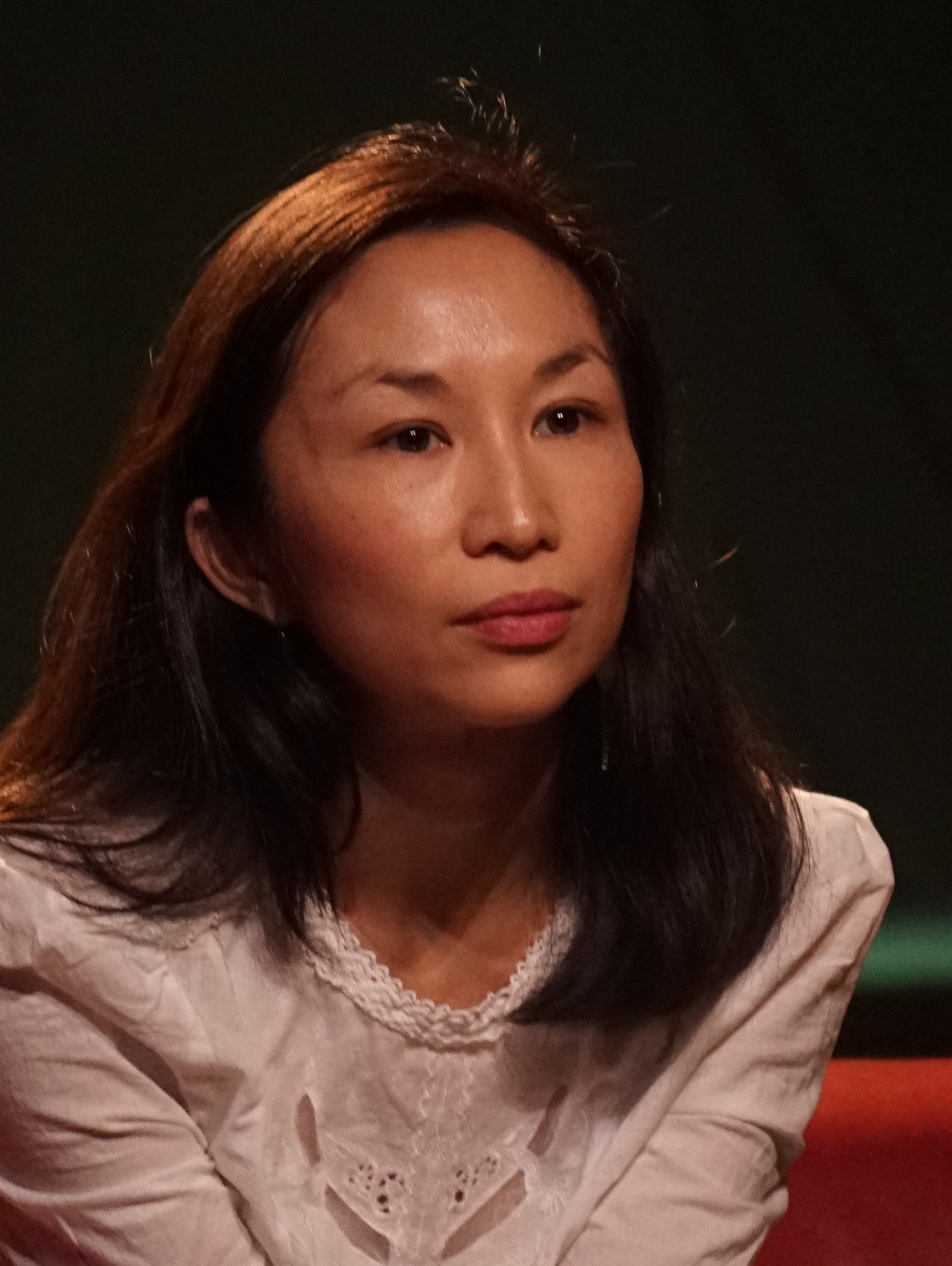
Loo Hui Phang

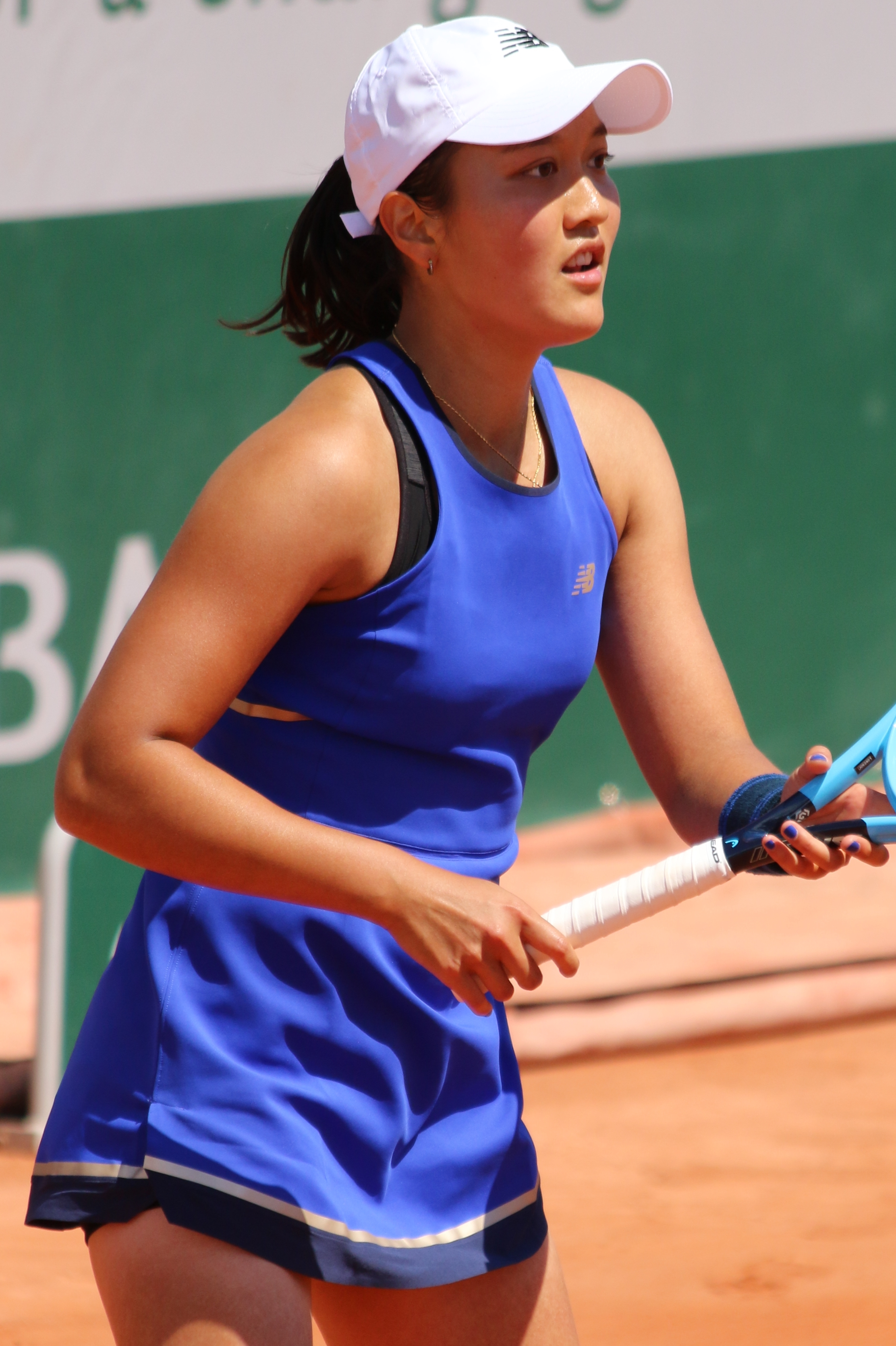
Harmony Tan

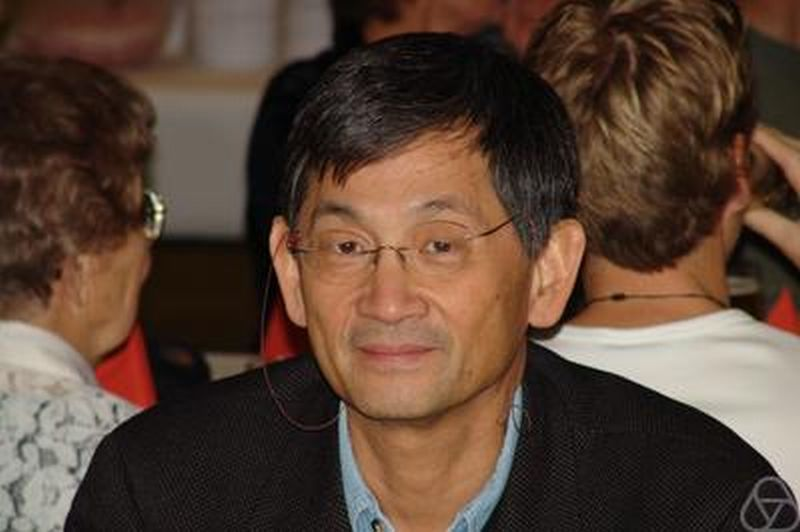
Lê Dũng Tráng

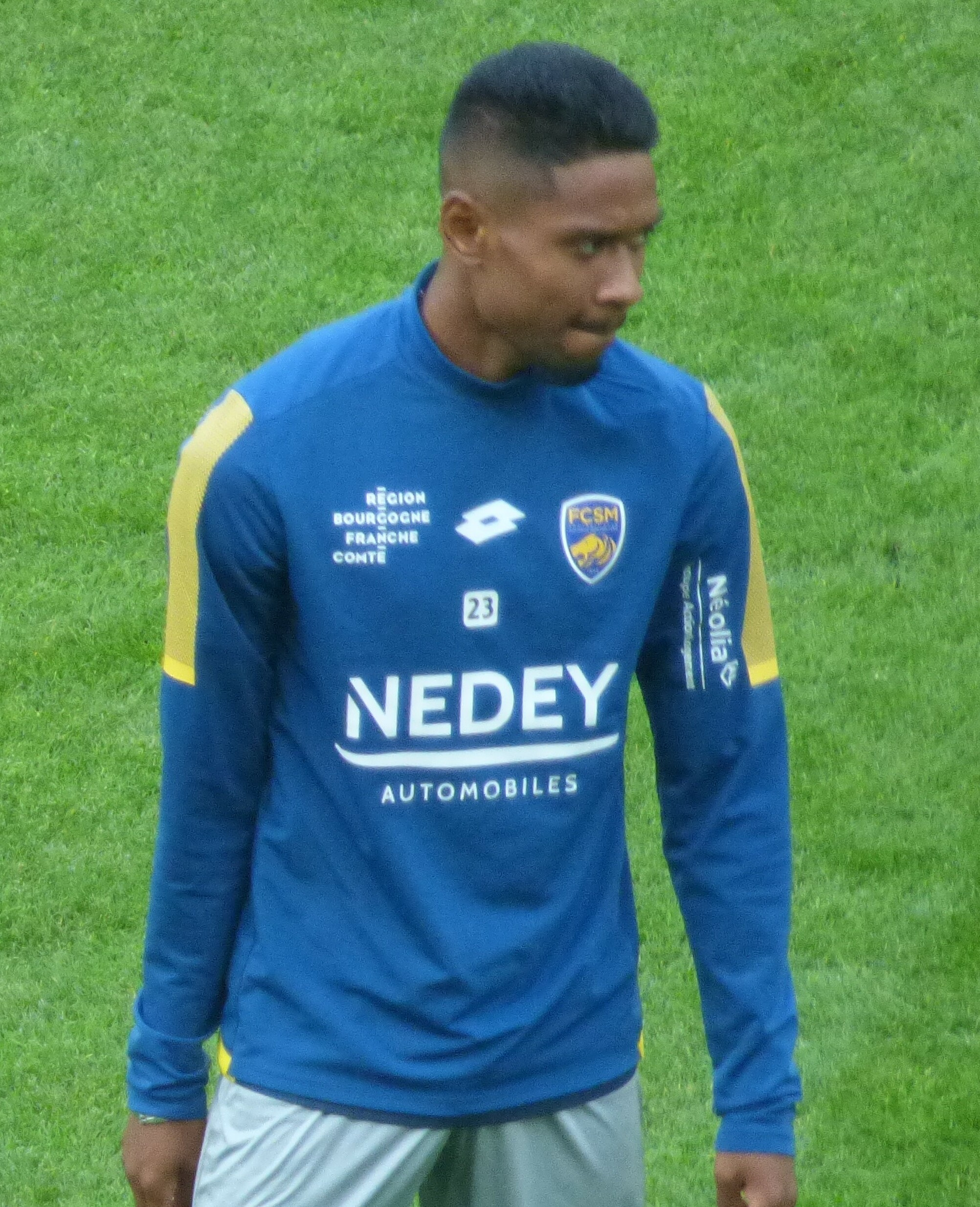
Jason Pendant

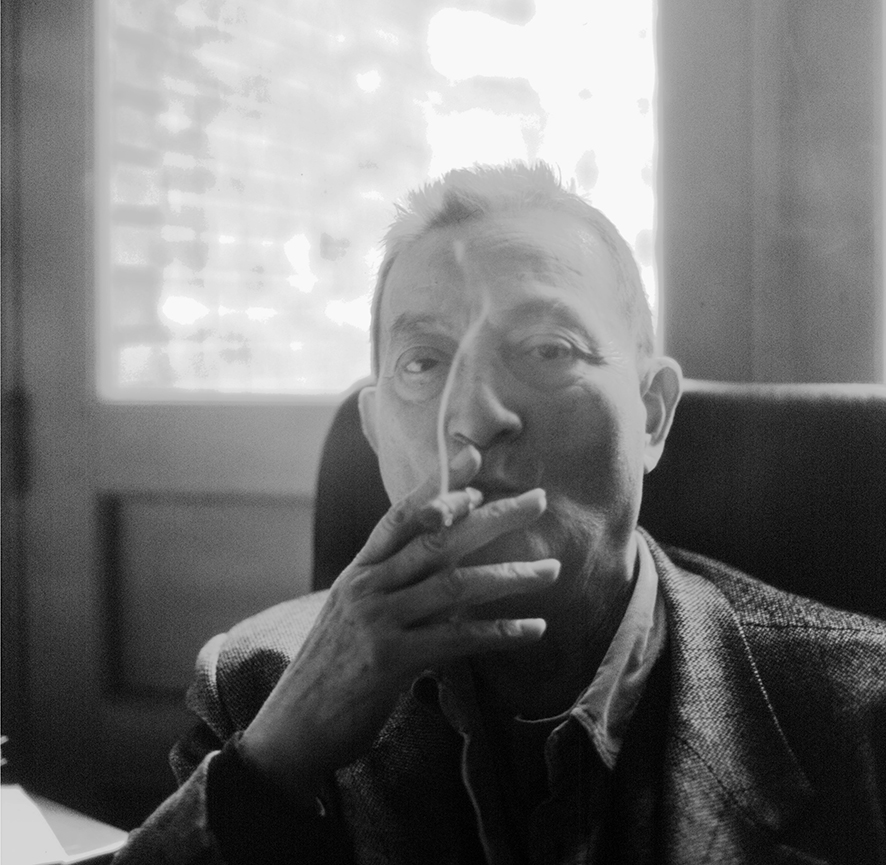
Georges Condominas

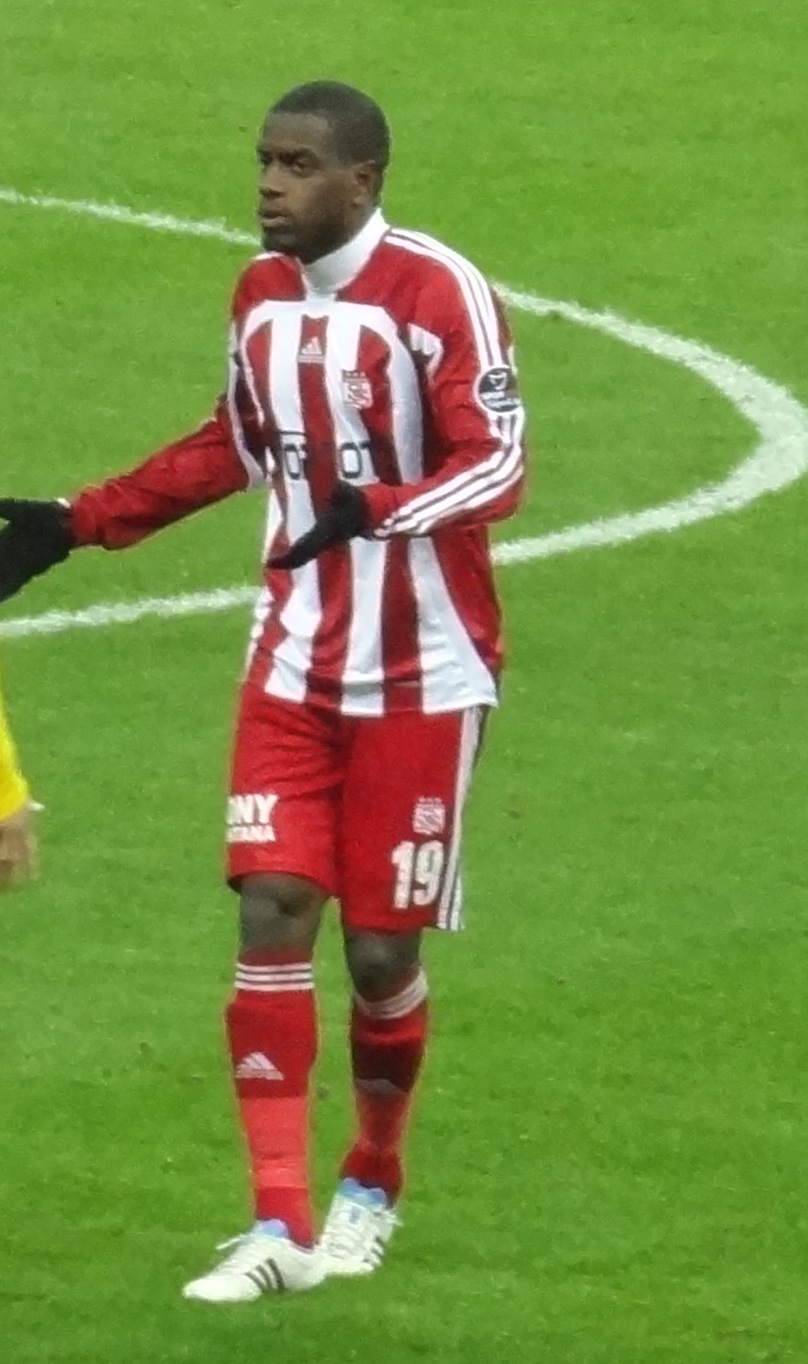
Jacques Faty

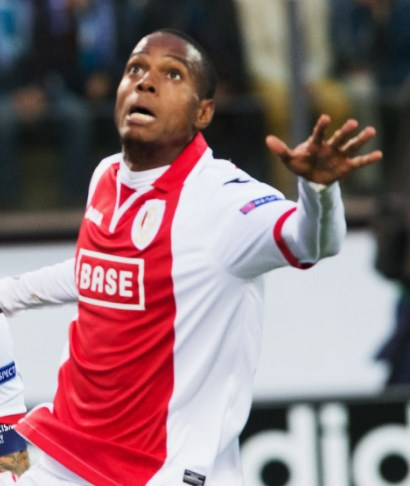
Ricardo Faty

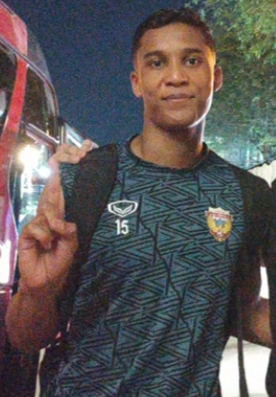
Leygley Adou

== See also ==
- France–Vietnam relations
- French Indochina
- French language in Vietnam
- Cochinchina
- Annam (French protectorate)
- List of Vietnamese people
- Asian diasporas in France

== Cited sources ==
- Blanc, Marie-Eve (2004), "Vietnamese in France", in Ember, Carol (ed.), Encyclopedia of Diasporas: Immigrant and Refugee Cultures Around the World, Springer, pp. 1158–1166, ISBN 978-0-306-48321-9
- Bousquet, Gisèle L. (1991), Behind the Bamboo Hedge: The Impact of Homeland Politics in the Parisian Vietnamese Community, Ann Arbor: University of Michigan Press, ISBN 0-472-10174-9
- Dorais, Louis-Jacques (1998), "Vietnamese Communities in Canada, France, and Denmark", Journal of Refugee Studies, vol. 11, no. 2, Oxford University Press, pp. 107–124, doi:10.1093/jrs/11.2.107, archived from the original on 2012-04-01
