= Journal of Singularities =

- Discipline: Mathematics
- Language: English
- Edited by: David B. Massey

Publication details
- History: 2010–present
- Publisher: Worldwide Center of Mathematics
- Open access: Yes

Standard abbreviations
- ISO 4: J. Singul.

Indexing
- ISSN: 1949-2006
- OCLC no.: 793076413

Links
- Journal homepage

The Journal of Singularities is a peer-reviewed open-access scientific journal which publishes research in the area of singularity theory. It was established in 2010 by David B. Massey, who remains editor-in-chief. It is published by the Worldwide Center of Mathematics.

== Abstracting and indexing ==
The journal is indexed and abstracted in:

- Emerging Sources Citation Index
- MathSciNet
- Scopus
- zbMATH
