= Lê Dũng Tráng =

Vietnamese-French mathematician (1947–2025)

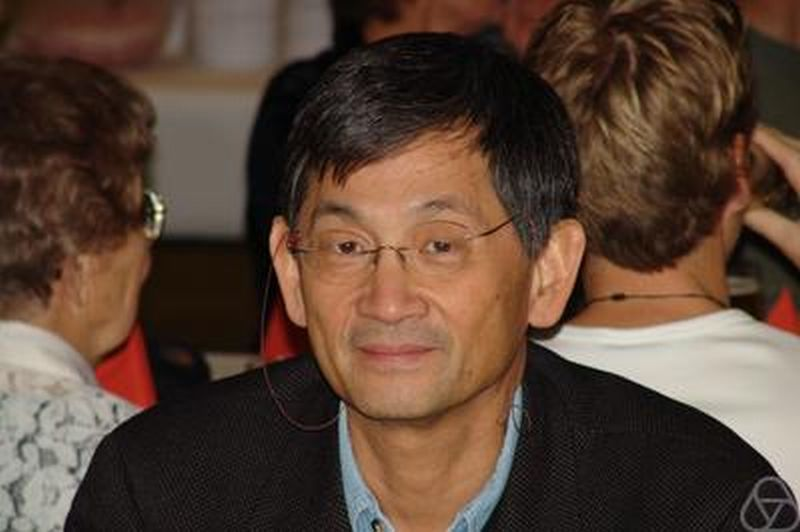
Tráng in 2004

Lê Dũng Tráng (27 July 1947 – 19 November 2025) was a Vietnamese-French mathematician.

== Life and career ==
At the end of 1949, Tráng came to France. He attended the Lycée Louis-le-Grand in Paris. He obtained a Ph.D. degree at the University of Paris in 1969 and 1971 under the supervision of Claude Chevalley and Pierre Deligne. From 1975 to 1999, he was a professor at the University of Paris VII and research director of the CNRS. From 1983 to 1995, he was also a professor at the École Polytechnique. From 2002 to 2009, he headed the department of mathematics at the International Centre for Theoretical Physics (ICTP), in Trieste, Italy.

Tráng was a frequent guest scientist at Harvard University (with Heisuke Hironaka) and Northeastern University (with Terence Gaffney and David B. Massey).

He was particularly concerned with singularity theory in the complex domain (Milnor fibrations, perverse sheaves).

In 2000, he was involved in promoting scientific exchange between the United States and Vietnam. For this, he received an honorary doctorate from the Vietnam Academy of Science and Technology in 2004. He became a Fellow of the Third World Academy of Sciences in 1993.

His students included Hélène Esnault and Claude Sabbah.

Tráng died in Pau, Pyrénées-Atlantiques on 19 November 2025, at the age of 78.

== Selected publications ==
- Sur les noeuds algébriques, Compositio Mathematica 25 (1972), 281-321.
- With Helmut Hamm, Un théoreme de Zariski du type de Lefschetz, Annales Scientifiques de l'École Normale Supérieure 6 (1973), 317–366.
- Calcul du nombre de cycles évanouissants d'une hyper surface complexe, Annales de l'Institut Fourier 23 (1973), 261–270, NUMDAM.
- With C. P. Ramanujam, The invariance of Milnor's number implies the invariance of the topological type, American Journal of Mathematics 98 (1976), 67–78
- Some remarks on relative monodromy, Real and complex singularities 1 (Proc. Ninth Nordic Summer School), 397-403.
- With Bernard Teissier, Variétés polaires locales et classes de Chern des variétés singulieres, Annals of Mathematics 114 (1981), 457-491.
- With Francoise Michel and Claude Weber, Courbes polaires et topologie des courbes planes, Annales Scientifiques de l'École Normale Supérieure, Sér.4, band 24, 1991, pp. 141–169, NUMDAM
- Complex analytic functions with isolated singularities, Journal of Algebraic Geometry 1 (1992), 83-99.
- With J.P. Brasselet and J. Seade, Euler obstruction and indices of vector fields, Topology 39 (2000), 1193-1208.

== Literature ==
- Jean-Paul Brasselet, José Luis Cisneros-Molina, David Massey, José Seade, Bernard Teissier (Editor) Singularities: international conference in honor of the 60th birthday of Lê Dũng Tráng, Cuernavaca/Mexico 2007, 2 volumes, Contemporary Mathematics, American Mathematical Society 2008.
