= Hélène Esnault =

French mathematician

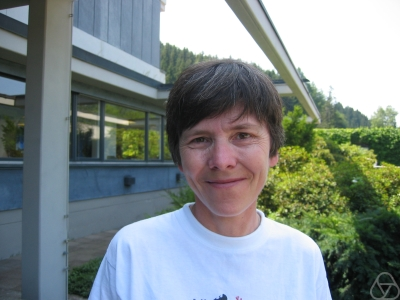
Esnault at Oberwolfach in 2006

Hélène Esnault (born 17 July 1953) is a French and German mathematician, specializing in algebraic geometry.

== Career ==
Born in Paris, Esnault earned her PhD in 1976 from the University of Paris VII. She wrote her dissertation on Singularites rationnelles et groupes algebriques (Rational singularities and algebraic groups) under the direction of Lê Dũng Tráng.

She did her habilitation at the University of Bonn in 1985, and pursued her studies at the University of Duisburg-Essen. Afterwards, she was a Heisenberg scholar of the Deutsche Forschungsgemeinschaft (DFG) at the Max Planck Institute for Mathematics in Bonn.

She became the first Einstein Professor at Freie Universität Berlin in 2012, as head of the algebra and number theory research group, after working previously at the University of Duisburg-Essen, the Max-Planck-Institut für Mathematik in Bonn, and at the University of Paris VII.

In 2007 Esnault was a founding editor of the journal Algebra & Number Theory. From 1998 to 2010 she co-edited Mathematische Annalen; she has also served as editor of Acta Mathematica Vietnamica, Astérisque, Duke Mathematical Journal, Mathematical Research Letters, Acta Mathematica.

== Awards and honors ==
In 2001 she won the Prix Paul Doistau-Émile Blutet of the Académie des sciences. In 2003, she received together with Eckart Viehweg the Gottfried Wilhelm Leibniz Prize.. In 2019, she won the Cantor medal..

In 2014 she was elected to the Academia Europaea and is a member of the Academy of Sciences Leopoldina, the Berlin-Brandenburg Academy of Sciences and Humanities, the Europäische Akademie Nordrhein-Westfalen, the Danish Academy, the Polish Academy of Sciences.

She received a Dr. Honoris Causa of the Vietnam Academy of Science and Technology in 2009, of the l'University of Rennes Université de Rennes in 2013, of the l'University of Chicago en 2023.

In 2026 she was awarded the Legion of Honour..
