= Claude Sabbah =

French mathematician

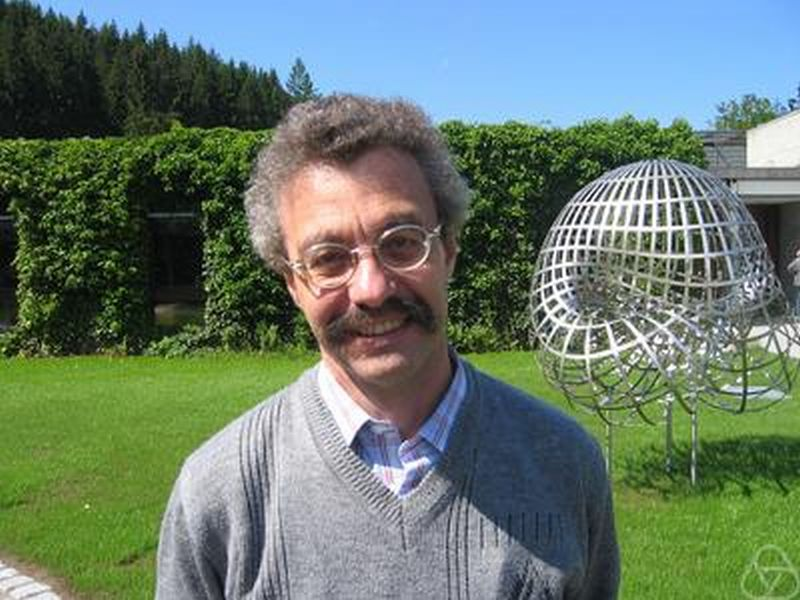
- Claude Sabbah in 2007
- Born: October 30, 1954 (age 71)
- Scientific career
- Fields: Mathematics
- Doctoral advisor: Lê Dũng Tráng

Claude Sabbah (born 30 October 1954) is a French mathematician and researcher at École Polytechnique.

== Education ==
Sabbah received his doctoral degree from Paris Diderot University in 1976 under the supervision of Lê Dũng Tráng.

== Selected publications ==
=== Books ===
- Introduction to Stokes Structures, Springer Verlag, 2012, ISBN 978-3-642-31694-4
- Polarizable twistor D-modules, Société Mathématique de France, 2005 ISBN 2-856-29174-0
- With Jean-Michel Bony, Bernard Malgrange and Laurent Schwartz : Distributions. Dans le sillage de Laurent Schwartz, Éditions de l'École polytechnique, 2003, ISBN 2-7302-1095-4
- Déformations isomonodromiques et variétés de Frobenius, EDP Sciences, 2002, ISBN 2-86883-534-1
  - English translation : Isomonodromic Deformations and Frobenius Manifolds, Springer Verlag, 2008, ISBN 1-84800-053-7
- Équations différentielles à points singuliers irréguliers et phénomène de Stokes en dimension 2, Société mathématique de France, 2000, ISBN 2-856-29085-X
