= Worldwide Center of Mathematics =

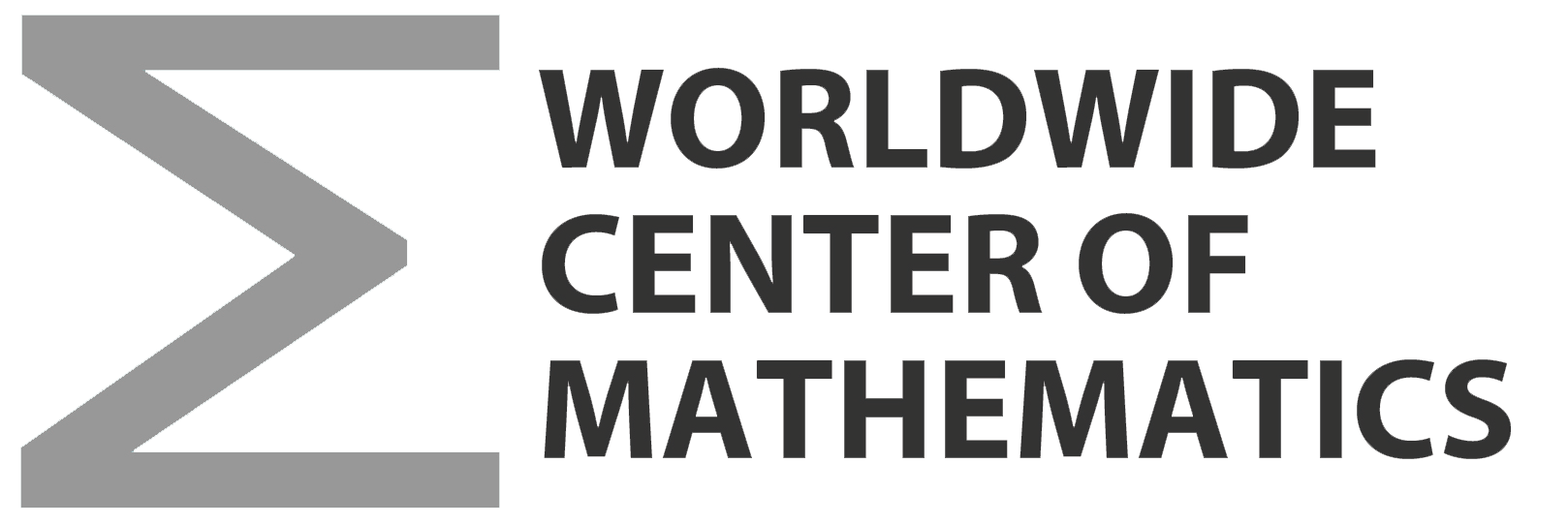
- Founded: 2008
- Founder: David B. Massey
- Country of origin: United States
- Headquarters location: Cambridge, Massachusetts
- Official website: centerofmath.com

The Worldwide Center of Mathematics (or Center of Math) is an American education technology company that publishes mathematics textbooks and produces educational videos and mathematical research. Since 2010, it has published the Journal of Singularities.

== History ==
The Center of Math was founded in 2008 by David B. Massey and is based in Cambridge, Massachusetts. It publishes textbooks, and additionally offers open textbooks.
