= David B. Massey =

American mathematician

- Education: Duke University
- Scientific career
- Fields: singularity theory
- Workplaces: Northeastern University; Worldwide Center of Mathematics
- Doctoral advisor: William L. Pardon

David B. Massey (born August 24, 1959) is an American mathematician. He completed both his undergraduate studies and his doctoral research work at Duke University, receiving his Ph.D. in 1986 for his results in the area of complex analytic singularities under the direction of William L. Pardon.

In 1988, he was awarded a National Science Foundation Postdoctoral Research Fellowship, and went to conduct research on singularities at Northeastern University. In 1991, he assumed a regular faculty position in the Mathematics Department at Northeastern. He has remained at Northeastern University ever since, where he is now a full professor.

He has published over 35 research-level papers and two research-level books and written four Calculus textbooks. He is the editor-in-chief of an open-access journal, the Journal of Singularities.

In the fall of 2008, Massey founded the Worldwide Center of Mathematics, which is an independent research and learning center for mathematics located in Cambridge, MA.

== Selected publications ==
Journal articles

- "Critical Points of Functions on Singular Spaces", Top. and its Appl., vol. 103, 55–93 (2000)
- "Semi-simple Carrousels and the Monodromy", Annales de l'Institut Fourier, vol. 56 (1), 85–100 (2006)
- "Intersection Cohomology, Monodromy, and the Milnor Fiber", International Jour. of Math., vol. 20 (4), 491–507 (2009)

Monographs

- "Lê Cycles and Hypersurface Singularities", Lecture Notes in Mathematics, vol. 1615 (1995)
- "Numerical Control over Complex Analytic Singularities", Memoirs of the American Mathematical Society, No. 778 (2003)

Textbooks

- Worldwide Differential Calculus (2009)
- Worldwide Integral Calculus, with infinite series (2010)
- Worldwide Multivariable Calculus (2010)
