= Association Générale des Etudiants Vietnamiens de Paris =

The Association Générale des Etudiants Vietnamiens de Paris (AGEVP) (Vietnamese: Tổng hội Sinh viên Việt Nam tại Paris) was officially founded in 1964 to the growing needs of young Vietnamese students. Composed mostly of youth leaders, AGEVP pays special attention to sports and organizes numerous cultural events including the Festival of the Vietnamese New Year.

Primarily academic or friendly, the activities of the AGEVP have grown and diversified significantly over the years to make the association one of the flagship organizations of the Vietnamese community in Paris and in France.

== See also ==
- Overseas Vietnamese
