= Chinese people in Italy =

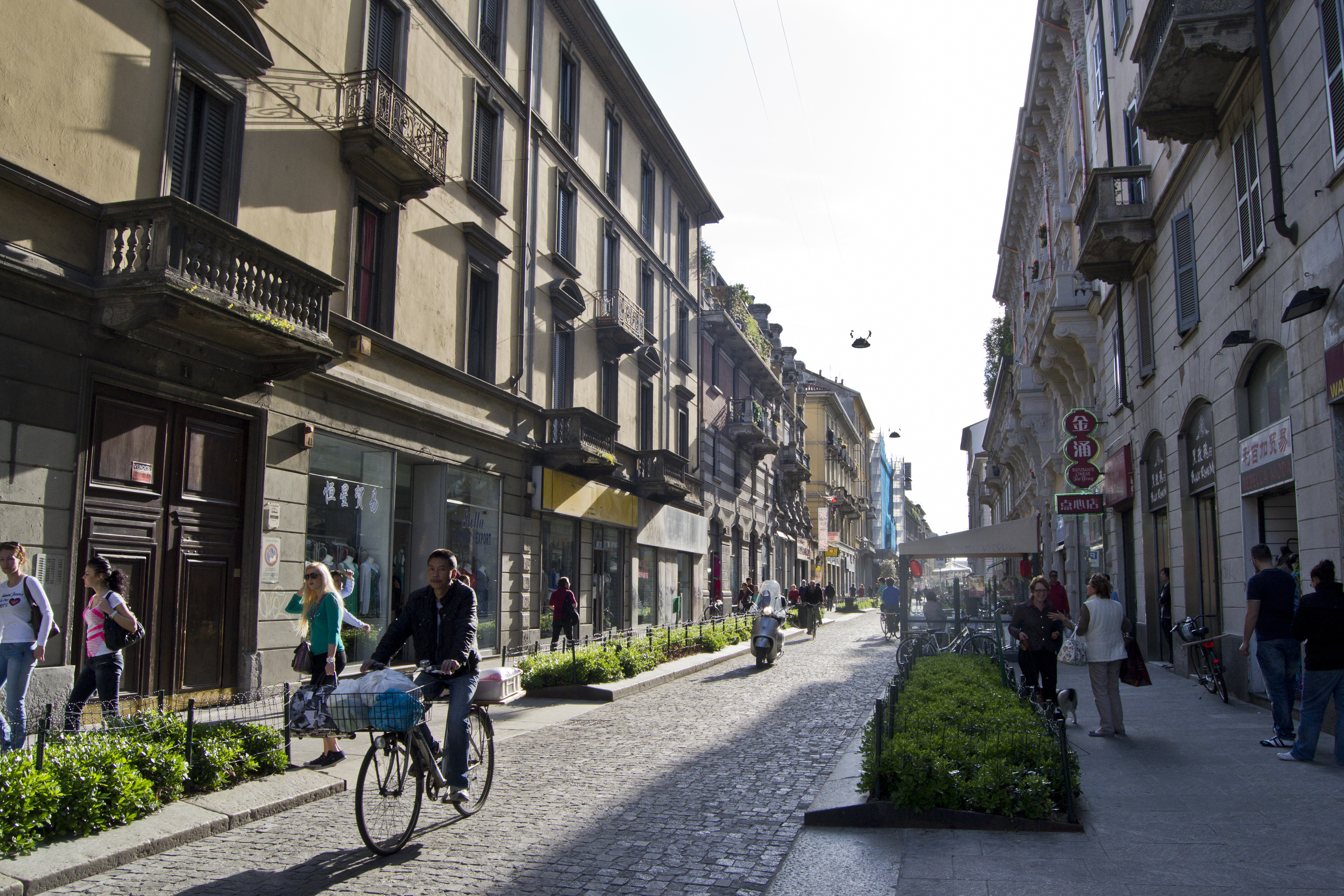
- Via Paolo Sarpi, center of Milan Chinatown

Total population
- 308,984 (2024); 0.52% of the Italian population

Regions with significant populations
- Lombardy, Tuscany, Veneto, Lazio

Languages
- Wenzhounese · Qingtian dialect · Mandarin Chinese · Italian

Religion
- Chinese folk religion, Buddhism, Christianity

Related ethnic groups
- Overseas Chinese

Chinese Italian
- Traditional Chinese: 意大利華人
- Simplified Chinese: 意大利华人
Transcriptions
Standard Mandarin
- Hanyu Pinyin: Yìdàlì Huárén
Wu
- Romanization: I5-deu5-lei6 gho2-jiae2
Yue: Cantonese
- Yale Romanization: Yidaaihleih Wàyàn

Alternative Chinese name
- Traditional Chinese: 意大利華僑
- Simplified Chinese: 意大利华侨
Transcriptions
Standard Mandarin
- Hanyu Pinyin: Yìdàlì Huáqiáo
Wu
- Romanization: I5-du5-li6 wu2-jiuao2
Yue: Cantonese
- Yale Romanization: Yidaaihleih Wàkìu

The Chinese people in Italy (Chinese: 意大利华人, Pinyin: Yìdàlì Huárén, Italian: Cinesi in Italia) comprise Italian residents or citizens of Chinese heritage and Chinese who migrated to Italy.

With a century-old history, the Chinese community in Italy has grown rapidly in recent decades. In 2014, there were at least 308,984 Chinese citizens in Italy. These figures do not account for former Chinese citizens who have acquired Italian nationality or Italian-born people of Chinese descent.

== History ==
=== Origin ===
Chinese immigration to Italy dates back to the late-19th century, who came from the older Chinese communities of Paris, Amsterdam, and other major European trading ports as seamen and traders. As Italy's most important economic and industrial center, Milan was the primary destination for the Chinese immigrating to Italy.

The majority of Chinese migrants in Italy come from Qingtian and the surrounding counties of Wenzhou in southern Zhejiang, a region known for its highly mountainous terrain, and tradition of emigration and overseas trade due to its lack of arable lands. When they first arrived in Milan, they initially settled in what is now the Porta Ticinese quarter, at the time the most impoverished and illicit area of Milan, but also offered some of the cheapest license for vending in the whole of European continent, allowing the community to gain a foothold by supporting themselves through street vending.

After the mid-1920s, trade in imitation pearls became the main business of Chinese community in Italy, allowing women of all social classes to purchase the otherwise unaffordable jewelries. When the imitation pearl industry waned by the end of the decade, the community began to dedicate themselves to the processing of silk for ties and leather and belts.

=== Wartime ===
The outbreak of World War II and the ensuing conflicts have inflicted serious devastation to the Chinese community in Italy and wider regions of Europe. After Italy, under the Fascist government of Benito Mussolini, entered the war on the side of Germany and Japan through the signing of the Axis Pact on 27 September 1940, the Chinese residents, whose home country was aligned with the Allied Powers, came under suspicion. The Italian authorities launched widespread arrests of Chinese nationals. Close to 200 migrants from Qingtian were incarcerated in the internment facility at Isola del Gran Sasso in Abruzzo.

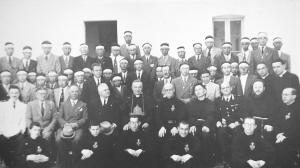
The 40 Qingtianese men who converted to Catholicism in Isola del Gran Sasso concentration camp, August 1941

A report published in L' Osservatore Romano on 4–5 August 1941 noted that forty of the internees underwent baptism in the camp's church, following missionary work by a Chinese clergyman identified as Pastor Chang. The internment ended in late 1943 when local anti-Fascist partisans took control of the area and freed those held at the camp.

== Demographics ==
In 2010, Prato, Tuscany had the largest concentration of Chinese people in Italy and all of Europe. It has the second largest population of Chinese people overall in Italy after Milan.

=== Religion ===
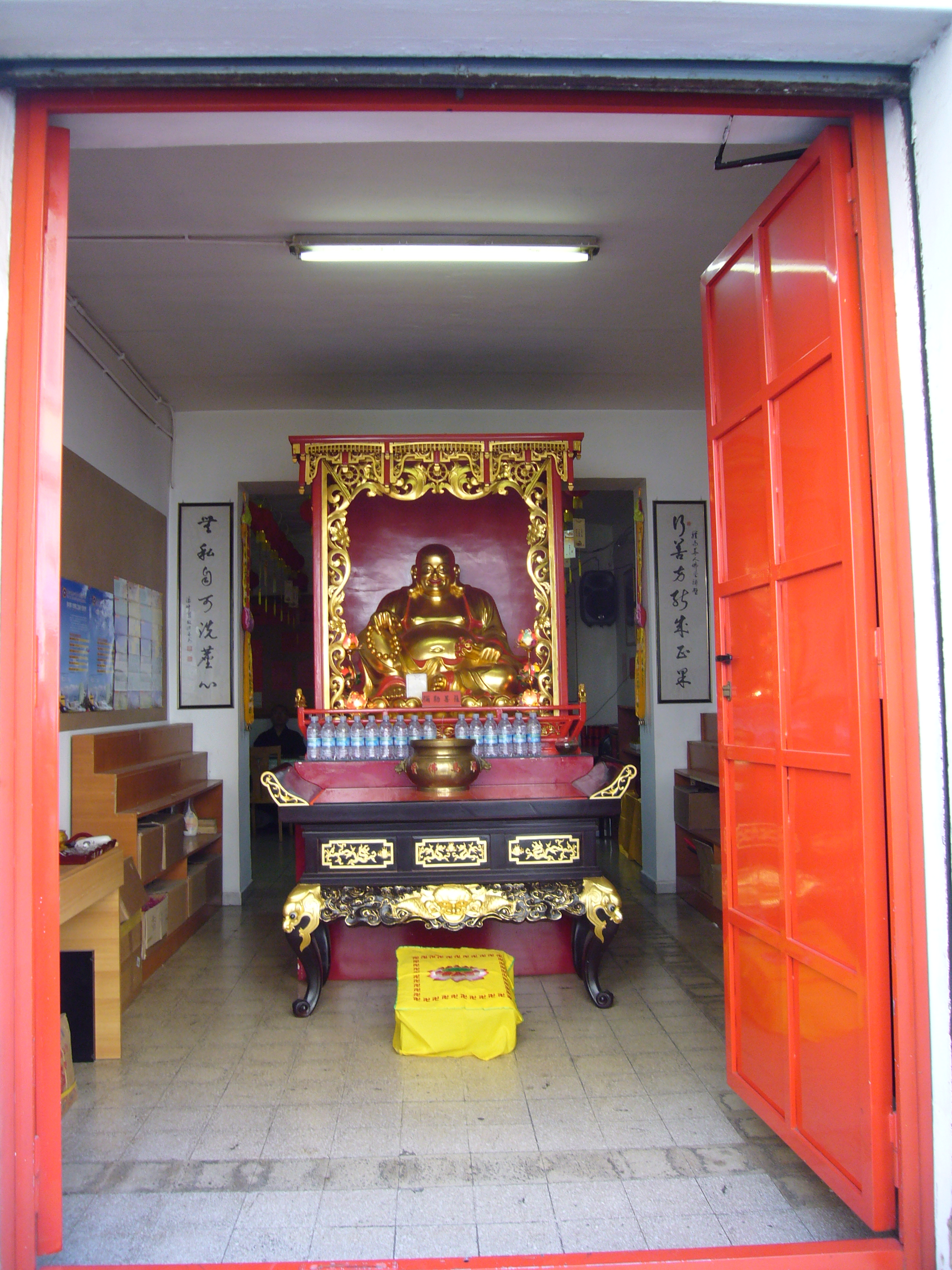
Putuoshan Buddhist temple of the Chinese community in via Ferruccio, Esquilino, Rome.

Religion of Chinese in Italy (2010)
1. Non religious / secular (39.9%)
2. Chinese folk religion (38.4%)
3. Buddhism (13.7%)
4. Catholic Church (3.60%)
5. Protestantism (3.30%)
6. Jehovah's Witnesses (1.10%)

In 2010, approximately one quarter of the Chinese community was classified as belonging to the Chinese (folk) religion. The surveyors weren't able to determine a precise Taoist identity. Only 1.1% of the surveyed people identified as such, and the analysts preferred to consider Taoism as an "affluent" of the Chinese religion. The survey found that 39.9% of the Chinese had a thoroughly atheist identity, not believing in any god, nor belonging to any religious organisation, nor practicing any religious activity.

The 2010 study also analysed the Chinese Christian community, finding it comprised 8% of the total population, of which 3.6% were Catholics, 3.3% Protestants and 1.1% Jehovah's Witnesses. The Christian community was small, but larger than that of the province of origin, especially for the Catholics and the Jehovah's Witnesses, the latter being an illegal religion in China. Protestants were found to be basically nondenominational and largely (70%) women.

2011 and 2012 ISTAT surveys of religious affiliation among the immigrants in Italy, the religion of the Chinese people in Italy were as follows:

- Non religious: 44.5%
- Buddhists: 44.4%
- Christians: 7.3%
- Other religions: 3.8%
Religion of Chinese in Italy (2011-2012)
1. Non religious (44.5%)
2. Buddhism (44.4%)
3. Catholic Church (5.00%)
4. Other religion (3.80%)
5. Protestantism (2.30%)

== Community relations ==
In 2007, several dozen protesters took to the streets in Milan over alleged discrimination. The northern Italian town of Treviso also ordered Chinese-run businesses to take down their lanterns because they looked "too oriental".

== Cities with significant Chinese communities ==
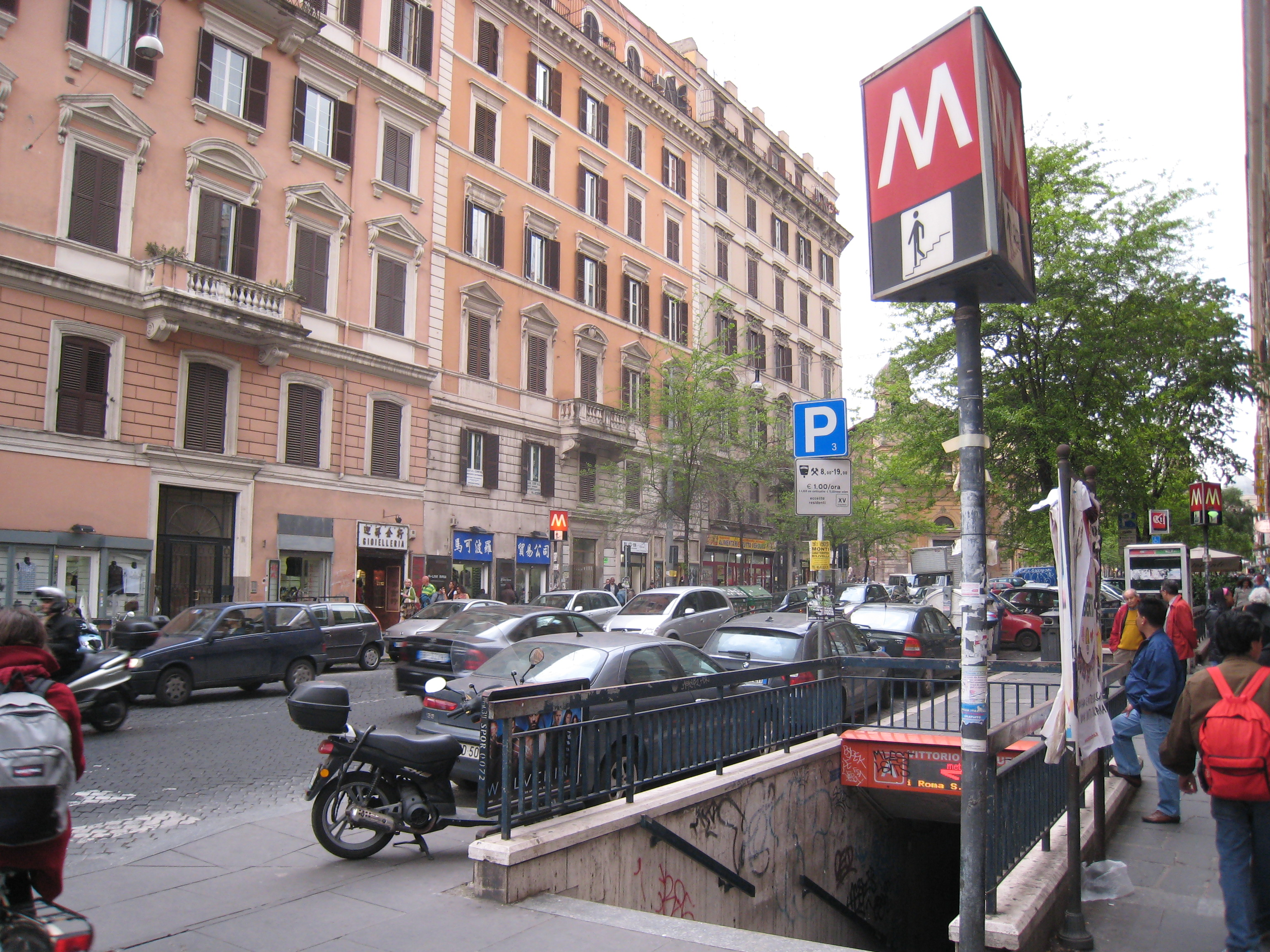
An image showing the "Rome Chinatown". Rome, along with Milan and Prato, contains the most significant Chinese community in Italy.

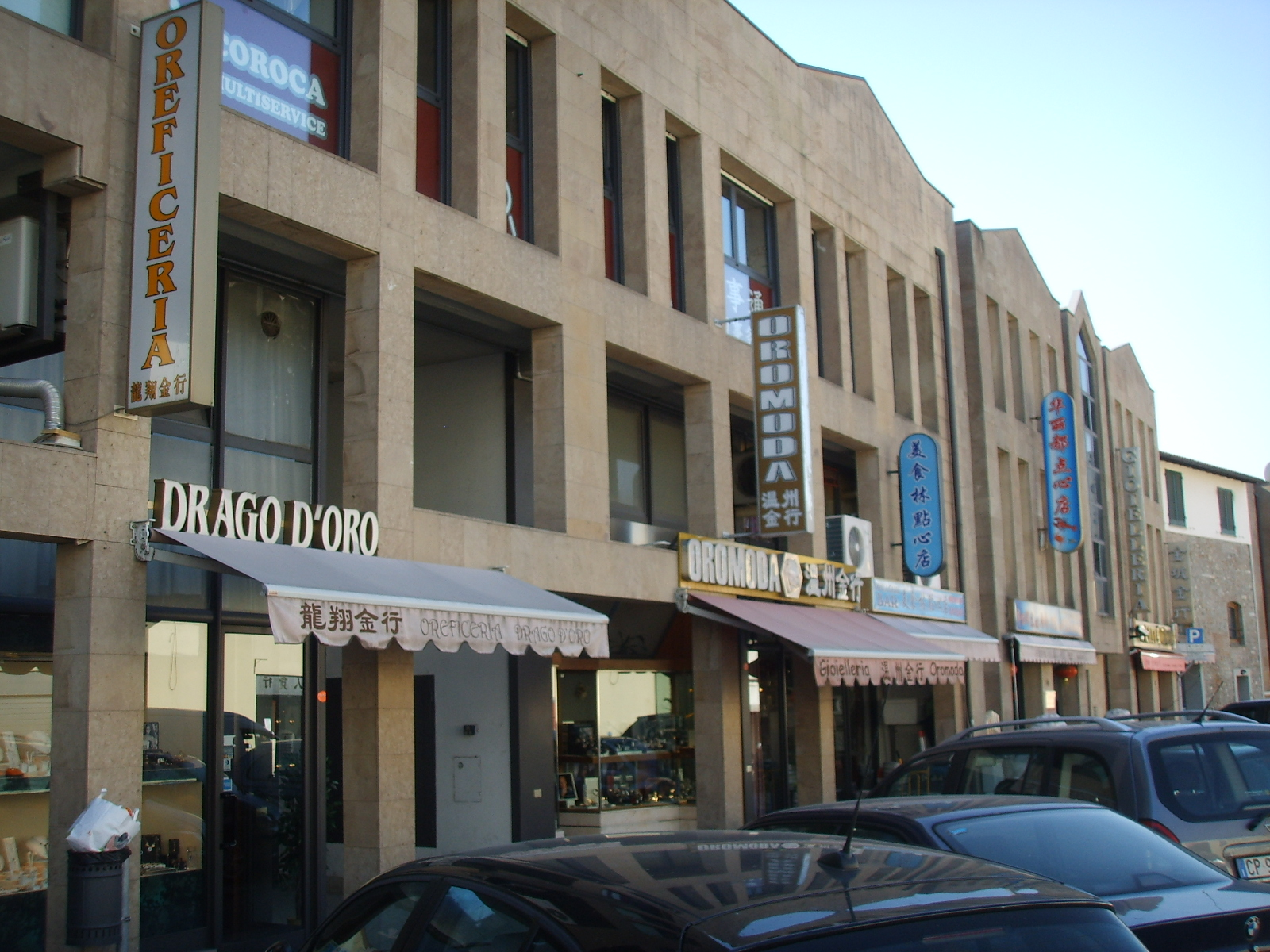
The Prato Chinatown, which is along with the Milan Chinatown and Rome Chinatown, the biggest and most important in Italy.

Based on 2011 ISTAT statistics.

- Milan 18,918 (1.43% on total resident population)
- Rome 12,013
- Prato 11,882 (6.32%)
- Turin 5,437
- Florence 3,890 (1.05%)
- Campi Bisenzio 3,018 (6.87%)
- Reggio Emilia 2,925 (1.72%)
- Bologna 2,654
- Naples 2,456
- Brescia 2,394 (1.23%)
- Venice 2,163
- Empoli 1,759 (3.67%)
- Genoa 1,637
- Forlì 1,607 (1.36%)
- Padua 1,571
- Fucecchio 1,502 (6.39%)

The city of Prato has the second largest Chinese immigrant population in Italy (after Milan with Italy's largest Chinatown). Legal Chinese residents in Prato in December 2008 were 9,927. In 2011, local authorities estimated the number of Chinese citizens living in Prato to be around 45,000, illegal immigrants included.

The majority of Chinese living in Italy are from the city of Wenzhou in the province of Zhejiang, some of them having moved from the Chinatown in Paris. In 2021, there were 33,871 (2,466%) Chinese in Milan and 33,649 (16,764%) in Prato.

== See also ==
- China–Italy relations
- Chinese diaspora
- Qingtianese diaspora
- Immigration to Italy
- Italians in China
