= Chinatowns in Europe =

Chinatown
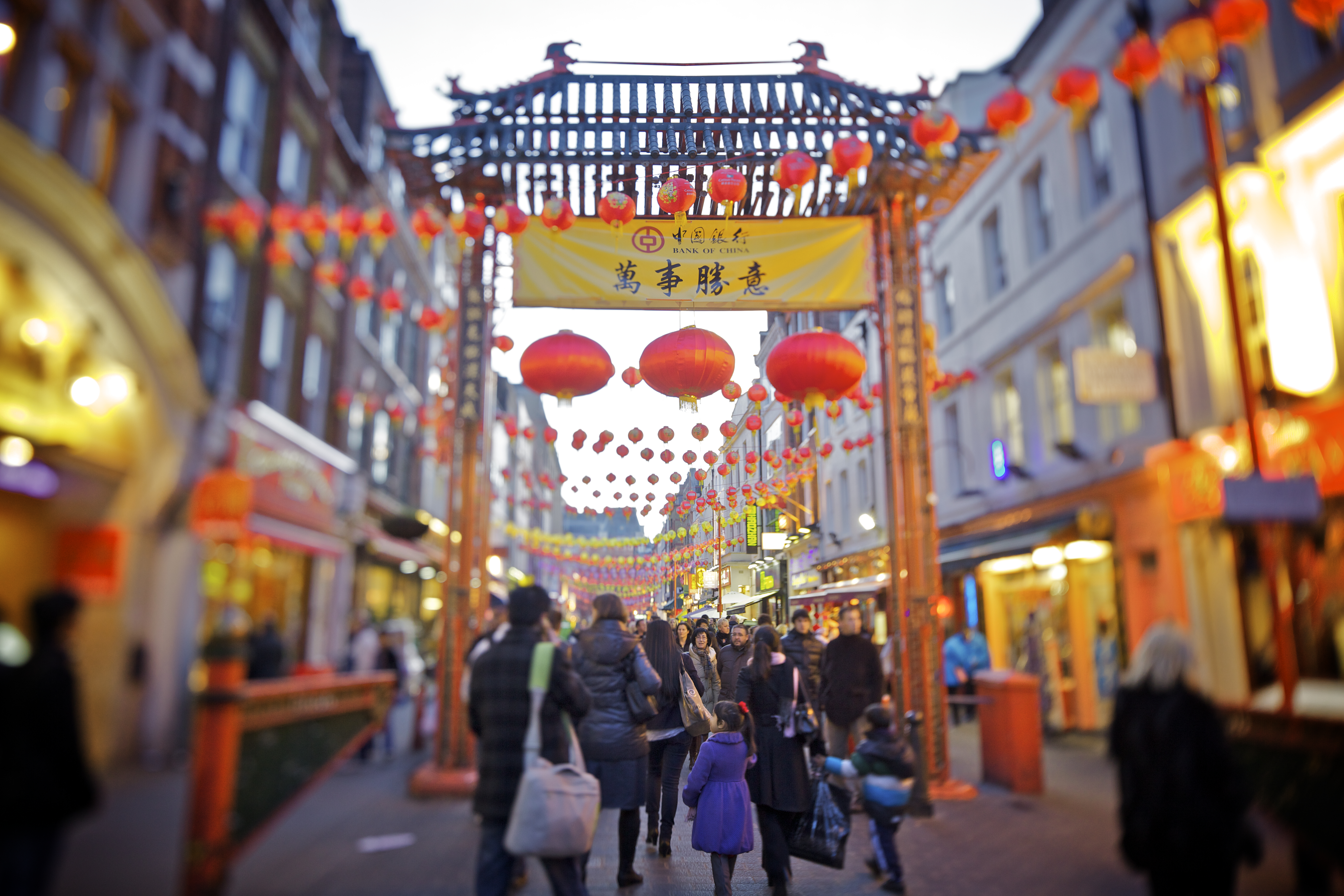
- London Chinatown
- Chinese: 唐人街
- Hakka: Tongˇ nginˇ gieˊ
Transcriptions
Standard Mandarin
- Hanyu Pinyin: Tángrénjiē
Hakka
- Romanization: Tongˇ nginˇ gieˊ
Yue: Cantonese
- Jyutping: Tong4 jan4 gaai1

Alternative Chinese name
- Traditional Chinese: 華埠
- Simplified Chinese: 华埠
- Hakka: Faˇ pu
Transcriptions
Standard Mandarin
- Hanyu Pinyin: Huábù
Hakka
- Romanization: Faˇ pu
Yue: Cantonese
- Jyutping: Waa4 fau6

Second alternative Chinese name
- Traditional Chinese: 中國城
- Simplified Chinese: 中国城
- Hakka: Zungˊ guedˋ sangˇ
Transcriptions
Standard Mandarin
- Hanyu Pinyin: Zhōngguóchéng
Hakka
- Romanization: Zungˊ guedˋ sangˇ
Yue: Cantonese
- Jyutping: Zung1 gwok3 sing4

Urban Chinatowns exist in several major European cities. There is a Chinatown in London, England, as well as major Chinatowns in Manchester, Birmingham, Newcastle and Liverpool. In Paris there are two Chinatowns: one where many Vietnamese – specifically ethnic Chinese refugees from Vietnam – have settled in the Quartier chinois in the 13th arrondissement of Paris which is Europe's largest Chinatown, and the other in Belleville in the northeast of Paris. Antwerp, Belgium also has an upstart Chinese community.

== Western Colonialism and European Chinatowns ==
Some European Chinatowns have long histories while others are still relatively new developments. Many early Chinese seamen settled in several European port cities and established several communities. The oldest Chinatown in Europe is in Liverpool, England. It was established in the early 19th century when Liverpool began importing cotton and silk from Shanghai. In the 1910s, mainland Chinese labourers from the Zhejiang province who remained in France established the first Chinatown of Paris. There are other Chinese who "jumped ship" to Europe after working as hired hands on European ships or docks.

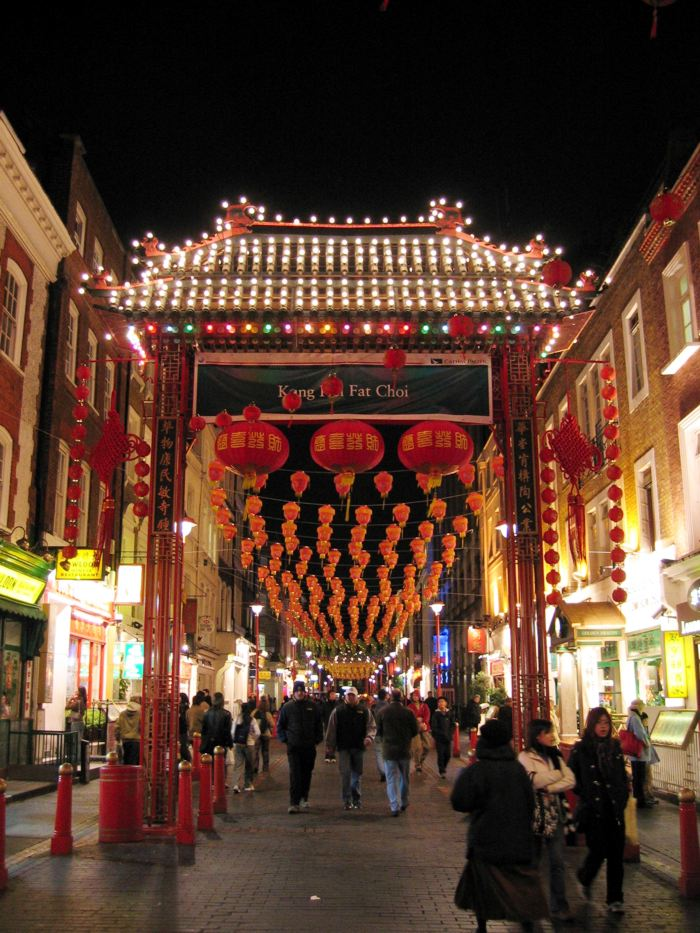
Entrance to the London Chinatown decorated for Chinese New Year 2004

As a legacy of European colonialism in Asia, many Asian subjects of British and Continental European empires immigrated to the colonizing country. During the 1950s, immigrants from Hong Kong began migrating to the United Kingdom in large numbers, which resulted in the formation of London's second Chinatown in the Soho district. Some Chinese from the former Portuguese colony of Macau have resettled in Portugal.

In 1998, many more Chinese Indonesian immigrants arrived to escape the violent pogroms in Indonesia towards ethnic Chinese (mainly due to the 1997 Asian financial crisis).

After the fall of Saigon at the close of the Vietnam War, the ethnic Chinese boat people from Vietnam were resettled in France and Germany in the late 1970s and 1980s and began settling extensively in Paris's Chinatown, immensely revitalising the area during that time. Paris's Chinatown currently has a vibrant Southeast Asian ethnic Chinese character, while its newer counterpart in Belleville largely consists of fairly recent mainland Chinese. Some Chinese Vietnamese refugees also ended up in Hong Kong, then a British-administered territory. These Vietnamese were resettled in the United Kingdom (there are several Vietnamese businesses in London's Chinatown).

Although Mainland China was carved into several Western spheres of influence, the country as a whole was not a colony of a foreign maritime power. Nevertheless, many mainland Chinese, legal and undocumented immigrants, have especially contributed to the development of Chinese communities in Europe, including the currently nascent Chinatown in the Esquilino district of Rome, Italy. There has been new immigration from the Fujian and Zhejiang provinces of China, many of whom are illegal immigrants who work in the unskilled service industries–especially in restaurants and garment sweatshops—of Europe.

== Chinatowns by European country ==
=== Belgium ===
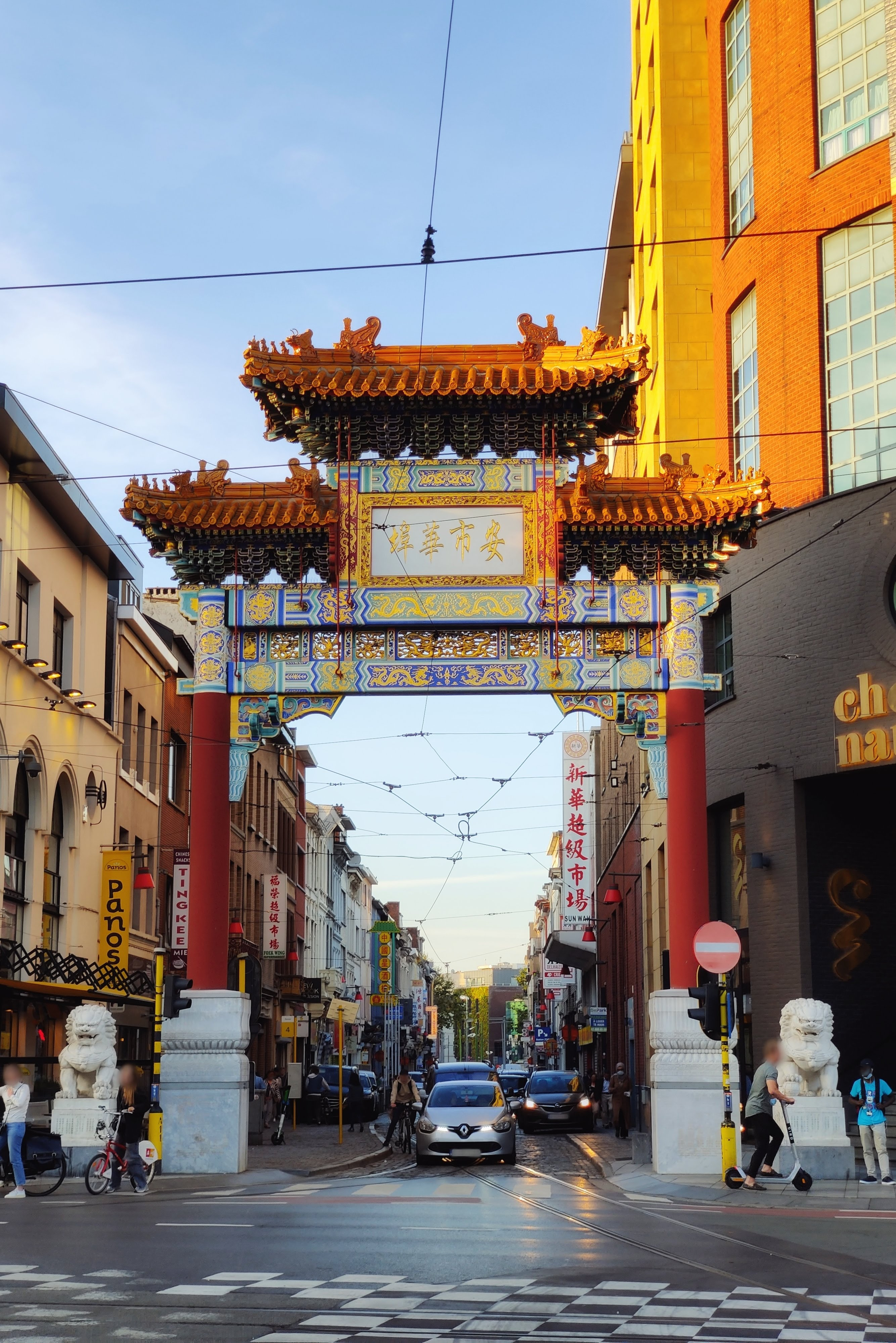
Chinatown, Antwerp

The only "official" Chinatown (recognized by the Belgian government as Chinatown on the tourist guide maps and books of Belgium) is Van Wesenbekestraat in Antwerp, Flanders. It consists of many shops, supermarkets, restaurants, and a bakery as well as a little Chinese temple.

=== France ===
The Chinese community in France was estimated to count 600,000 persons in 2004 and 700,000 persons in 2007. The Chinatown in Paris located in the 13th arrondissement is the largest in Europe.

==== Paris ====
Paris has several Asian neighborhoods (French: quartiers asiatiques), the largest being located in the 13th arrondissement (13th district). Chinatown Paris is bounded roughly by Avenue de Choisy, Avenue d'Ivry and Boulevard Masséna, and includes the Les Olympiades complex. The area was originally an ethnic Vietnamese district, when Vietnamese refugees arrived in the area in the 1970s following the Vietnam War. Later waves of immigrants included ethnic Chinese from Indochina, Laotians and Cambodians, who also fled their countries following their communist takeovers.

Although a large number of the earlier Vietnamese immigrants integrated into French society shortly after their arrival and moved to other areas of Paris and the surrounding Île-de-France region, they still maintain a strong commercial and cultural presence in the area. Within this neighborhood, commercial activity is dominated by Chinese and Vietnamese businesses, with a smaller number of Laotian and Cambodian establishments. Roughly 50,000 people live in the district, with a majority being Chinese, and significant Vietnamese and Laotian populations. The flagships of the Tang Frères and Paristore Asian specialty supermarkets are located close to each other in Chinatown.

Before WWII, Parisian Chinatown was based in a real Asian community, located in marginal and poor areas, formed through successive waves of migration, the first of them during the 1900s in the Arts et Métiers quarter around rue au Maire, then in the now disappeared Chinatown of Gare de Lyon. Since the 1920s, luxury goods shops and restaurants settled as well in the La Madeleine-Opera district, where the Japanese quarter of Paris is now located around rue Sainte-Anne, and in the Quartier Latin near place Maubert, where some Vietnamese restaurants can still be found.

Another Chinatown area has settled in Belleville, Paris, which was recently named one of the most unique neighborhoods in the world as a result of the heavy Asian influence in the district. There is a large number of Far East restaurants, especially on Rue de Belleville and on Rue Civiale.

==== Marne-la-Vallée ====
The second largest community in France, essentially Chinese and residential, is located in the new town of Marne-la-Vallée eastward of Paris, notably in the communes of Lognes, Torcy and Noisy-le-Grand.

==== Lyon ====
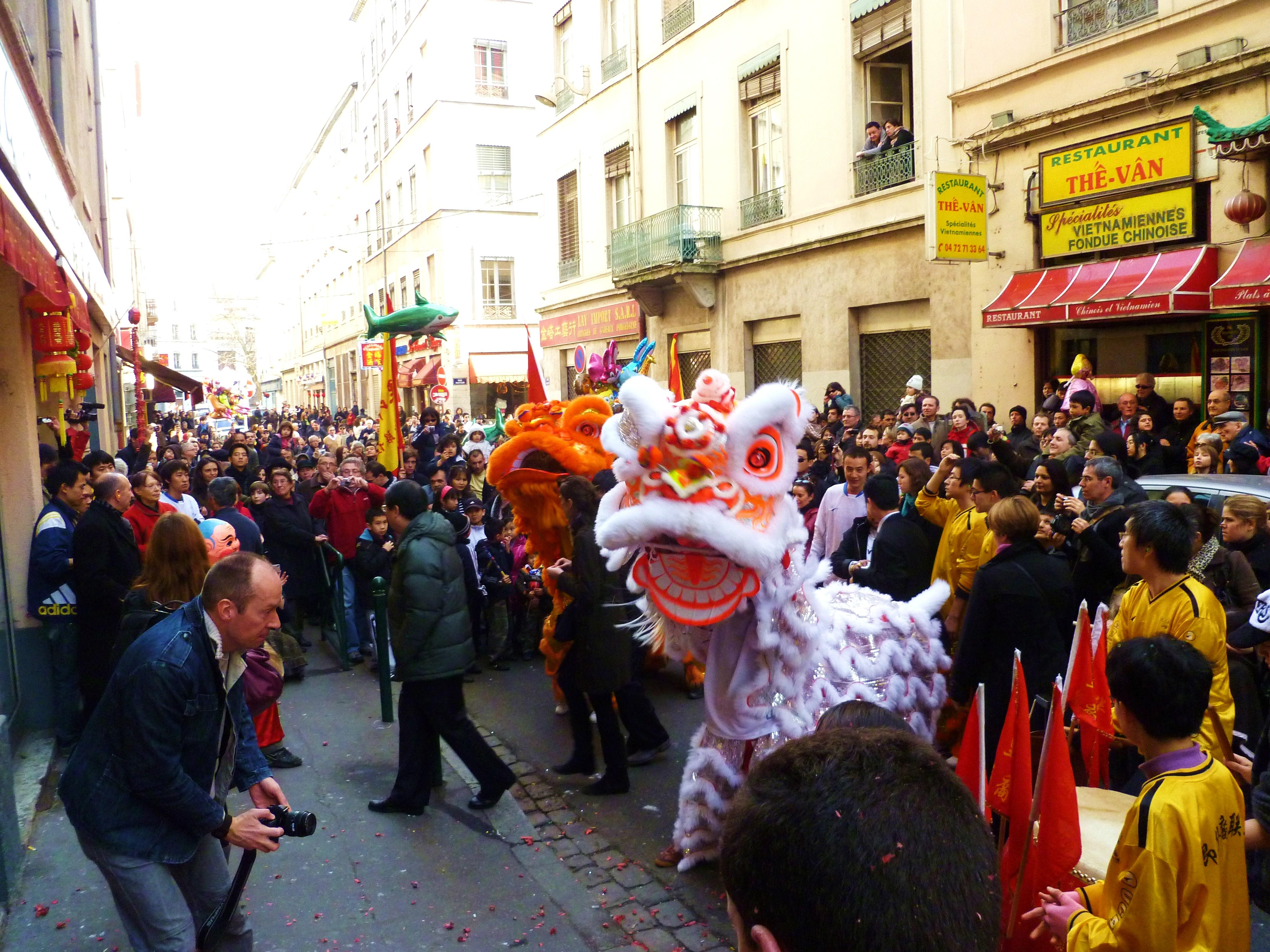
Chinese new year feast, on Passet street. On the left is Gérard Collomb, Lyon city mayor.

Lyon, with a Chinese community of 15,000 persons, also has a Chinatown, located in the Guillotière neighbourhood of the 7th arrondissement, on rue Passet, rue d'Aguesseau and rue Pasteur and the nearby streets in the area formed by rue Basse Combalot, rue de Marseille and rue Montesquieu. Thanks to its important silk industry and notably with the sericulture crisis of 1856, Lyon has early created a relationship with China. A Franco-Chinese institute existed as well from 1920 to 1946 at Fourvière for Chinese students.

==== Lille ====
The important Chinese community of Lille is disseminated in the city, but some Asiatic shops are gathered on rue Jules Guesde, in the cosmopolitan district of Wazemmes.

==== Toulouse ====
A small Chinatown is as well located in the Belfort district in Toulouse, mainly around rue Denfert Rochereau.

==== Montpellier ====
A new growing Asian community has settled in the Port Marianne District.

=== Germany ===
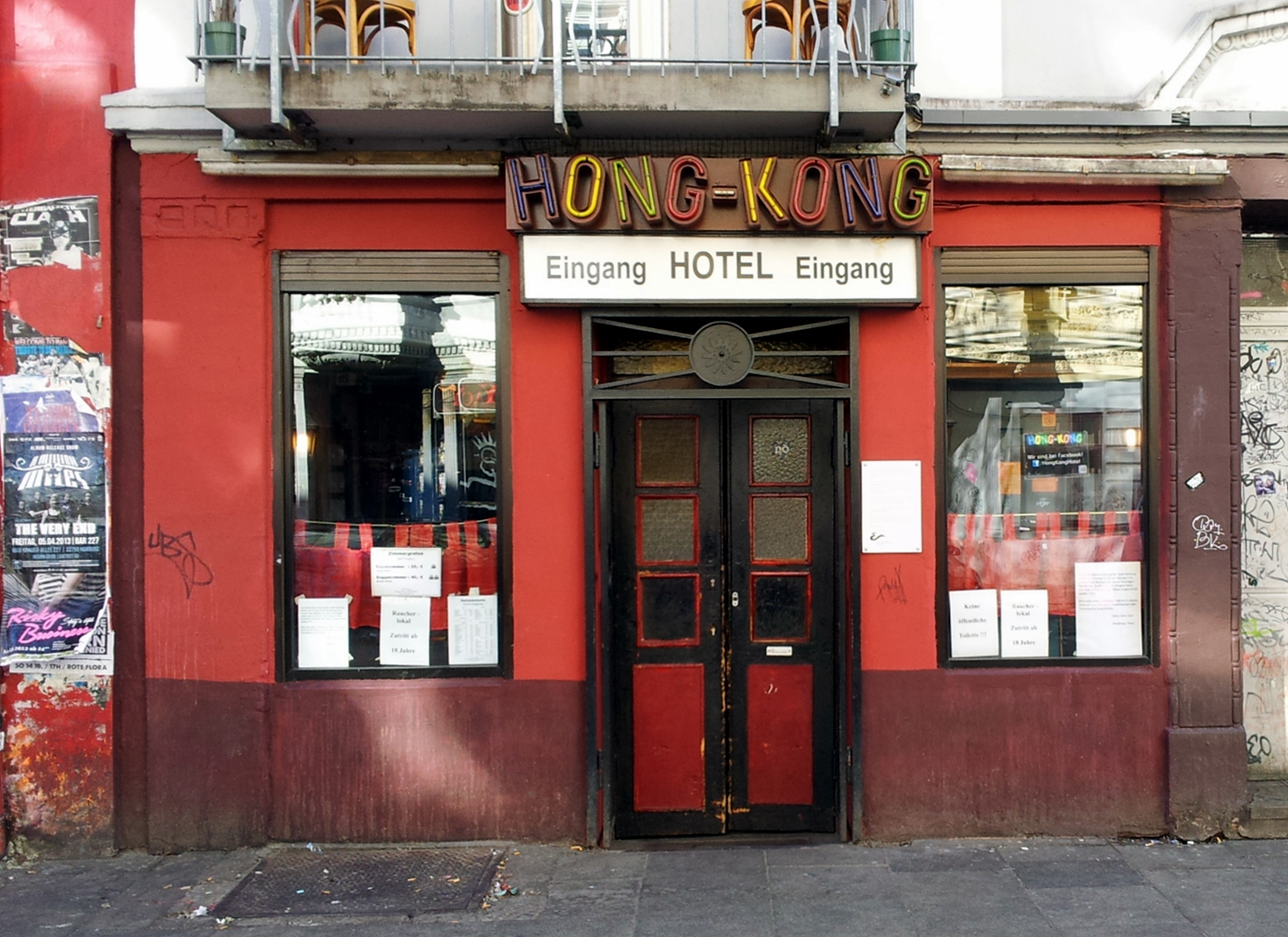
Hamburg-St. Pauli: Hong-Kong Bar & Hotel in the city's re-established Chinatown

Berlin, the capital of Germany, has no established Chinatowns, but many Chinese restaurants can be found in the area around Kantstrasse of Charlottenburg in the West (dubbed Kantonstrasse).

Hamburg, Germany's second largest city and its major port, has very close ties to China and Asia in general. Until the 1930s, it had the Chinesenviertel Chinatown within its St. Pauli district, that is being re-established since the 2010s. The city hosts the biennial high-level conference Hamburg Summit: China meets Europe and also has a major Chinese consulate at Elbchaussee 268 in Othmarschen since 1921. Shanghai is a sister city of Hamburg.

=== Greece ===
A small Chinatown exists in the port city of Thessaloniki, in the area around Aisopou Street, near the Thessaloniki railway station. The around 2,200 Chinese nationals that live in the city work and live in and around this area, which is characterised by an abundance of Chinese-owned commercial stores and restaurants.

=== Ireland ===
In Dublin, Parnell Street between O'Connell and Cumberland Streets hosts a row of Chinese businesses. Many are arrivals from Fuzhou.

=== Italy ===
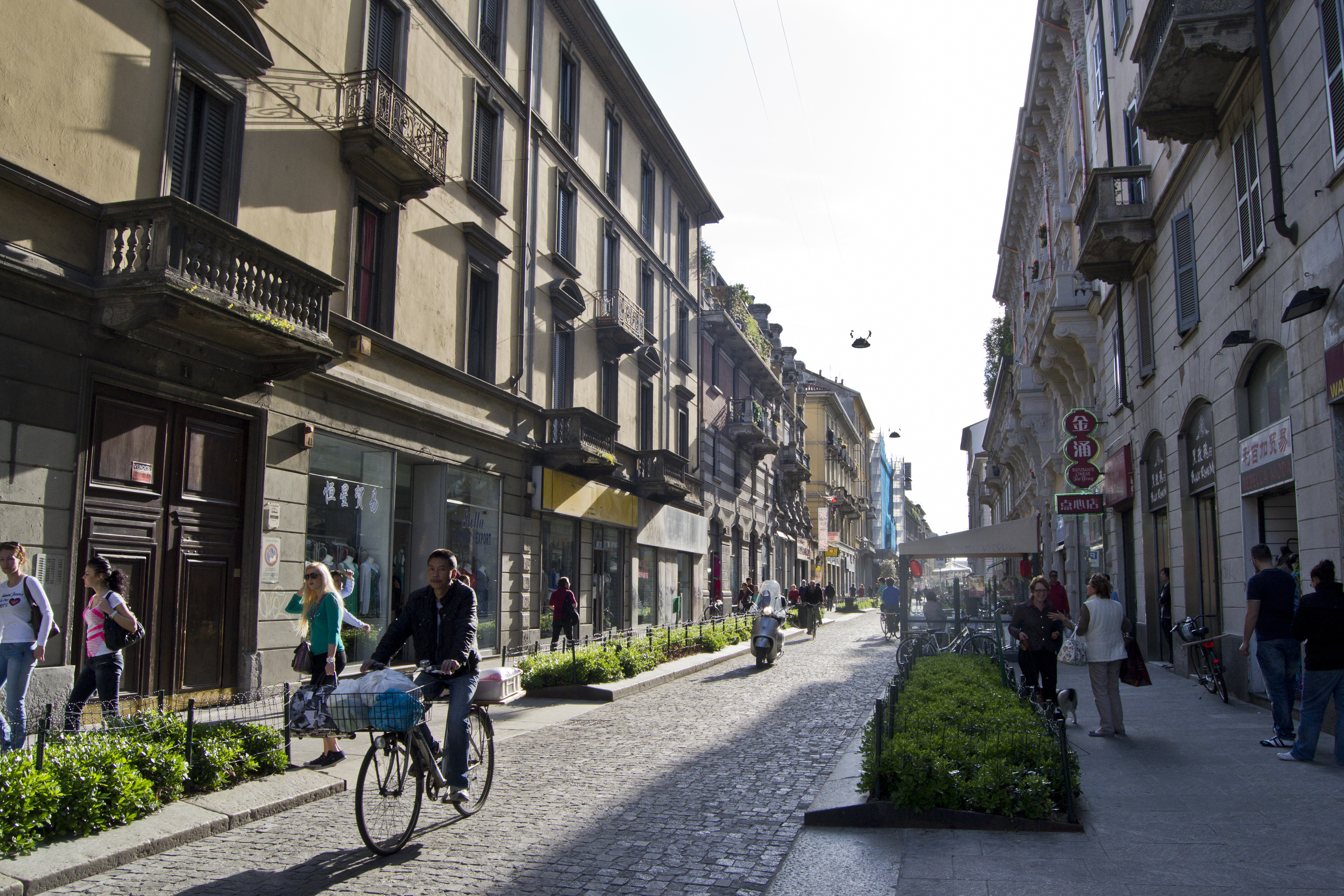
Via Paolo Sarpi, Milan's Chinatown

The country has had a very small Chinese population since World War II, but most of the current population has arrived since the 1980s. Over 310,000 Chinese are thought to be living in Italy according to 2016 statistics.

During the Second World War the silk products were replaced by leather belts more useful for the soldiers involved in the war. In the 1980s the community diversified its activities opening market stores, food stores and other shops. Today, chinatowns can be found in Prato and Milan.

The Italian term for Chinatown is quartiere cinese but Chinatown is also used.

=== Netherlands ===
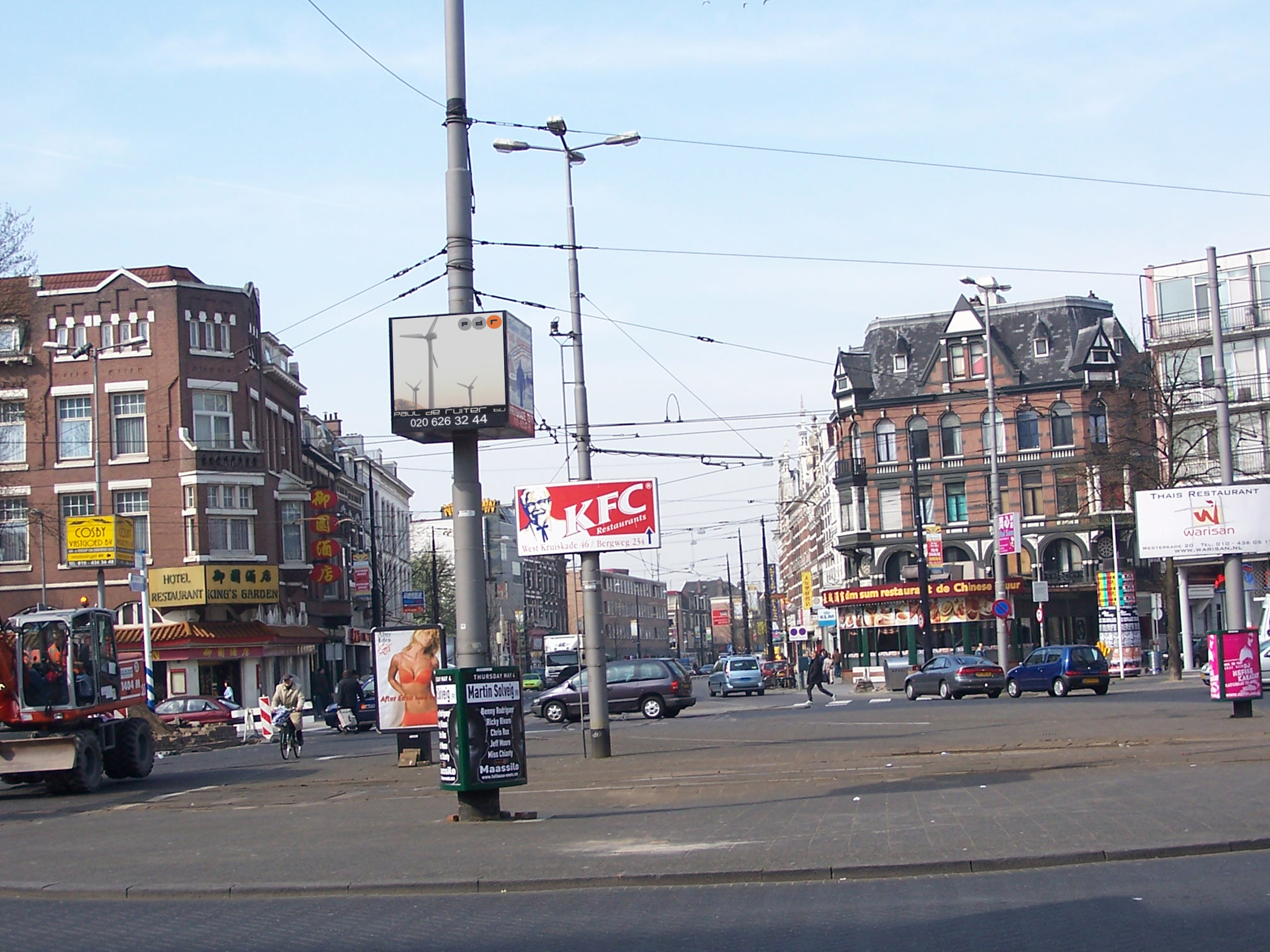
Chinatown, Rotterdam

The term "Chinatown" or "Chinese buurt" is used in the Dutch language.

The largest Chinatown of the Netherlands is located in Rotterdam, around the West-Kruiskade in the Oude Westen district. The first Chinese people settled in the Katendrecht district around 1911. A decade later the Chinese community at Katendrecht consisted of around 1500 people, which made it the largest Chinese community in the Netherlands.

After a large decline of people of Chinese origin in the Katendrecht area, more and more Chinese people moved to the West-Kruiskade area near the city center. Since the '80s this became the primary Chinatown of Rotterdam and started to attract Chinese people from smaller Dutch cities, like Eindhoven and Deventer.

The 2nd largest Chinatown is located near De Wallen, the famed red light district of Amsterdam. This Chinatown, located on the Zeedijk and the Geldersekade, was formed in the early 20th century and revitalised in the 1980s. The street signs in this neighbourhood are in Dutch and Chinese. Amsterdam's Chinatown also has the first and biggest Chinese-style Buddhist temple in the Netherlands. It is named "Fo Guang Shan He Hua Temple" after the Buddhist organization Fo Guang Shan.

The 3rd largest Chinatown is in the city of The Hague.

=== Poland ===
Poland's main Chinatown is located in Wólka Kosowska, where Chinese immigrants are mainly engaged in trade and gastronomy. Along with Chinese, there is also notable population of Vietnamese. Some of them represent third generation of people of Vietnamese origin being raised in Poland.

=== Portugal ===
Portugal's main Chinatown is Varziela Chinatown (Chinatown da Varziela), also known as Vila do Conde Chinatown in the outskirts of Vila do Conde, in Coastal Northern Portugal. The core of the community hosts 200 Chinese stores and has a population of 1500 ethnic Chinese (2015). Varziela Chinatown was established in 2001 in a decaying industrial area and it became a Chinese hub for Portugal and Spain, recently it started to attract Indians and other minorities. It bounced back from the 2008 crisis, when it was declining, the early community was said to have 160 stores and 600 ethnic Chinese inhabitants at its peak.

Varziela Chinatown is known for the illegal casinos, in an area where there is the legal Casino da Póvoa, one of the communities main entertainment venues, where the Chinese new year is traditionally celebrated.

Portugal's other Chinatowns are located in Lisbon, around Martim Moniz, mostly in the form of shopping centres and Porto Alto also has a Chinatown.

Some early Chinese immigrants to Portugal came from the former Portuguese territory of Macau, when it was returned to mainland Chinese control in 1999, while others came from Cambodia, Laos, and Vietnam. Many Chinese also came from Brazil to Portugal. Besides speaking Portuguese, the Chinese population in Portugal also speaks Mandarin, Cantonese, and some of them even speak a mixed Cantonese-Portuguese creole called Macanese (or Patuá).

=== Spain ===
There are about 220,000 Chinese in Spain. Most Chinese-Spanish residents are people whose ancestors were coolies from mainland China. Others are immigrants or refugees from other places in mainland China, Hong Kong, Macau, Taiwan, Malaysia, Korea, the Philippines, Vietnam, Indonesia, and especially Cuba and Puerto Rico. In Spain, Chinese immigrants tend not to form separate neighborhoods (the quintessential image of a Chinatown) but live in areas mixed with other immigrants and Spaniards. However, in some places, Chinese immigration is enough to give a Chinese color to some streets.

Some examples of Spanish Chinatowns in Madrid: Dolores Barranco St in the Usera district, Lavapiés neighborhood or General Margallo St. in the district of Tetuán, and in the Madrid metropolitan area "Cobo Calleja" industrial park is the biggest Chinese industrial area in Europe; it is located in the southern city of Fuenlabrada. Barcelona, however, has had an area named Barrio Chino since the 1920s, in the old city between the Ramblas and the Paral·lel. The residents have been poor Spaniards and the area is marked by its prostitution, to the extent that any prostitution district of any Spanish city may be known as barrio chino, regardless of any Chinese presence, though the term does not imply a population of Chinese residents. The term came from an article whose author compared the state of the area with the popular image of foreign Chinatowns. In fact, the area with the largest Chinese presence in Barcelona is around Arc de Triomf and Plaça de Tetuan. Other Spanish cities such as Valencia, Bilbao and Alicante have Chinese neighborhoods.

After the Spanish Miracle, Spain started receiving more Chinese immigrants, some of whom may have settled in the cheap Barrio Chino. As a result of the gentrification policy exemplified by the 1992 Summer Olympics, the area is being rebuilt as a chic neighborhood, and the more neutral name of El Raval has come to predominate. Recent Chinese immigrants have established wholesale clothes business at La Ribera, Ronda San Pedro and Trafalgar street. Barrios Chinos are also pan-Asian areas. Many Japanese, Koreans, Vietnamese, and Thais have settled in Barrios Chinos.

=== United Kingdom ===
Chinese people in the UK are relatively dispersed, and do not form ethnic enclaves as in many other countries, although most are to be found in large cities, several of which have Chinatowns, and the South-East. The largest Chinatown is in central London in the Soho area, established in the 1950s and 1960s. Other UK Chinatowns are found in the English cities of Liverpool, Birmingham, Manchester and Newcastle, the Scottish city of Glasgow and a growing population of Chinese immigrants are present in Edinburgh, the Welsh capital Cardiff and Belfast, Northern Ireland.

==== London ====
Soho is the main Chinatown currently but not the original Chinatown, which was located near the docks along the Thames as the Chinese arrived from Canton, which was the major international port of China in the early 18th century. Opium could not be legally traded in China proper initially and opium was inspected and traded in London by the Keswicks and the Taipans. Silk and porcelain, as well as tea were loaded here, where a Chinese community thrived near Canton Street in the Docklands.

London's current Chinatown in Soho is mainly commercially planned in the 1950s with many Chinese restaurants and businesses to detract from the sex trade in Soho. A new Chinese gate over Wardour Street marking the entrance to Leicester Square is planned as well. London's Chinatown is undergoing gentrification, with a £50 million planned regeneration.

There are plans to re-enact London's original Chinese district in Canary Wharf and the Docklands in Limehouse as part of the wider regeneration of East London to attract Chinese tourists. This area was bombed out, as with much of London, during the Blitz in the Second World War causing a relocation of the few ethnic Chinese who had lived there to other areas.

The Hakkas could not afford the rents from the Cantonese landlords, and moved out to Croydon where rents were very much cheaper to start businesses. As a result, other Chinese-run businesses can be found far away from central London, such as suburban Croydon.

The Government of Singapore owns the entire stretch of hotels around Cromwell Road.

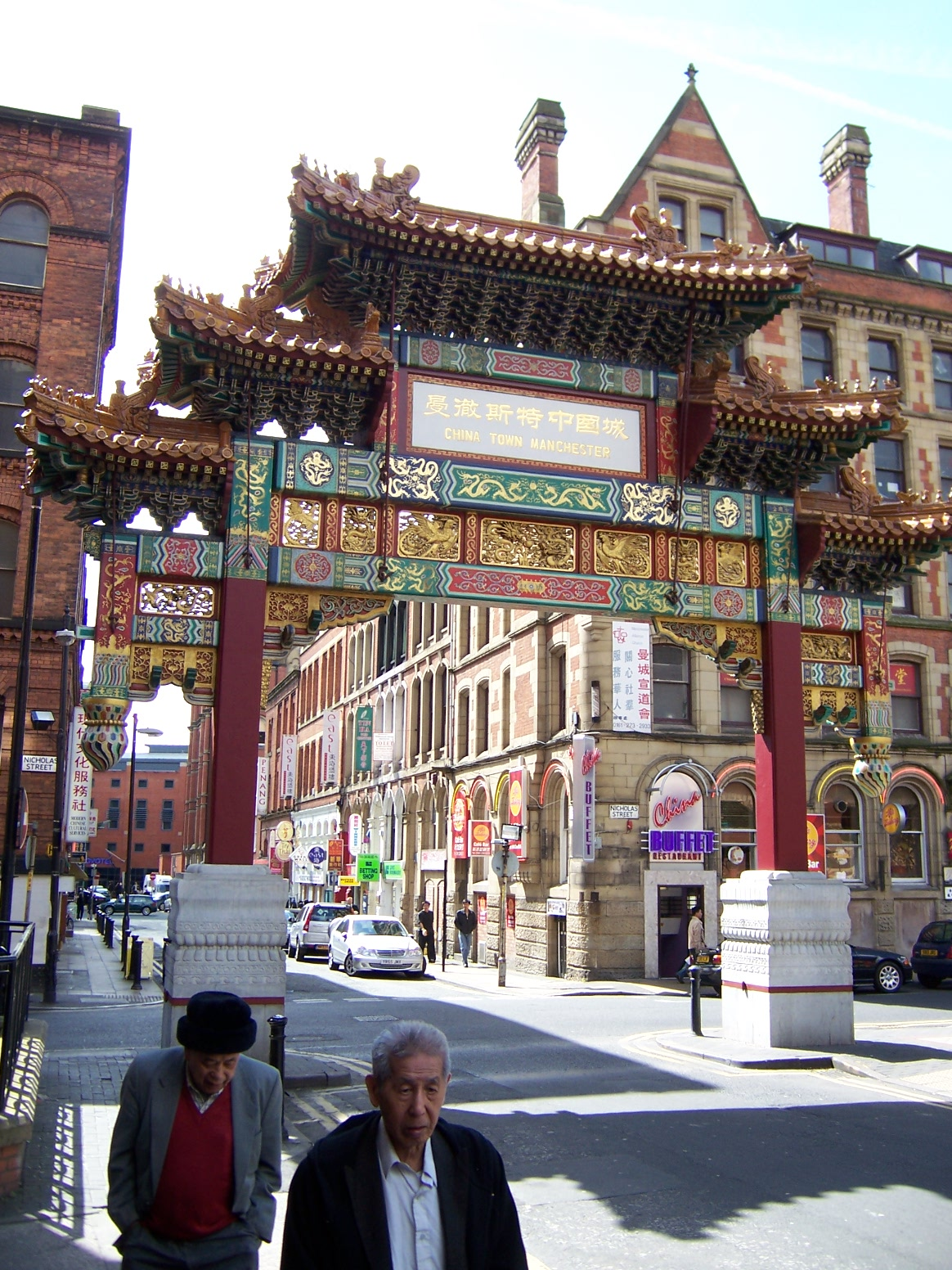
Chinatown, Manchester

==== Manchester ====
Manchester's Chinatown on Faulkner Street is the second largest in Britain after London's. The Chinese British population, many of whom are immigrants from former British-ruled Hong Kong, especially settled in the Greater Manchester area. However, Hong Kong immigration to the United Kingdom has leveled off over the years and there has been a rise in mainland Chinese immigration to the country.

==== Birmingham ====
Birmingham Chinatown is an area of Birmingham, United Kingdom. First emerging as an informal cluster of Chinese community organizations, social clubs, and businesses in the 1960s centred on Hurst Street, as a result of post-World War II migration from Hong Kong, the Chinese Quarter was officially recognized in the 1980s. It is well known for its Chinese restaurants, such as the China Court Restaurant, for the parade which is held there each year to celebrate the Chinese New Year, for the Birmingham Hippodrome and for being the location of the headquarters of Wing Yip.

To the rear of the area is the Irish Quarter which is located directly next to a large supermarket selling typical Chinese produce.

==== Glasgow ====
The Chinatown in Glasgow, Scotland is a Chinese shopping complex that opened in 1992 in Cowcaddens.

==== Newcastle ====
The Chinatown in Newcastle was primarily based on Stowell Street, but has expanded in recent years with many Chinese businesses in the surrounding area. The Chinatown incorporates the area from Stowell Street to Westgate Road. According to the BBC, Newcastle's Chinatown is also undergoing regeneration. A gateway costing £160,000 has recently been constructed by mainland Chinese engineers as part of the plans.

==== Liverpool ====
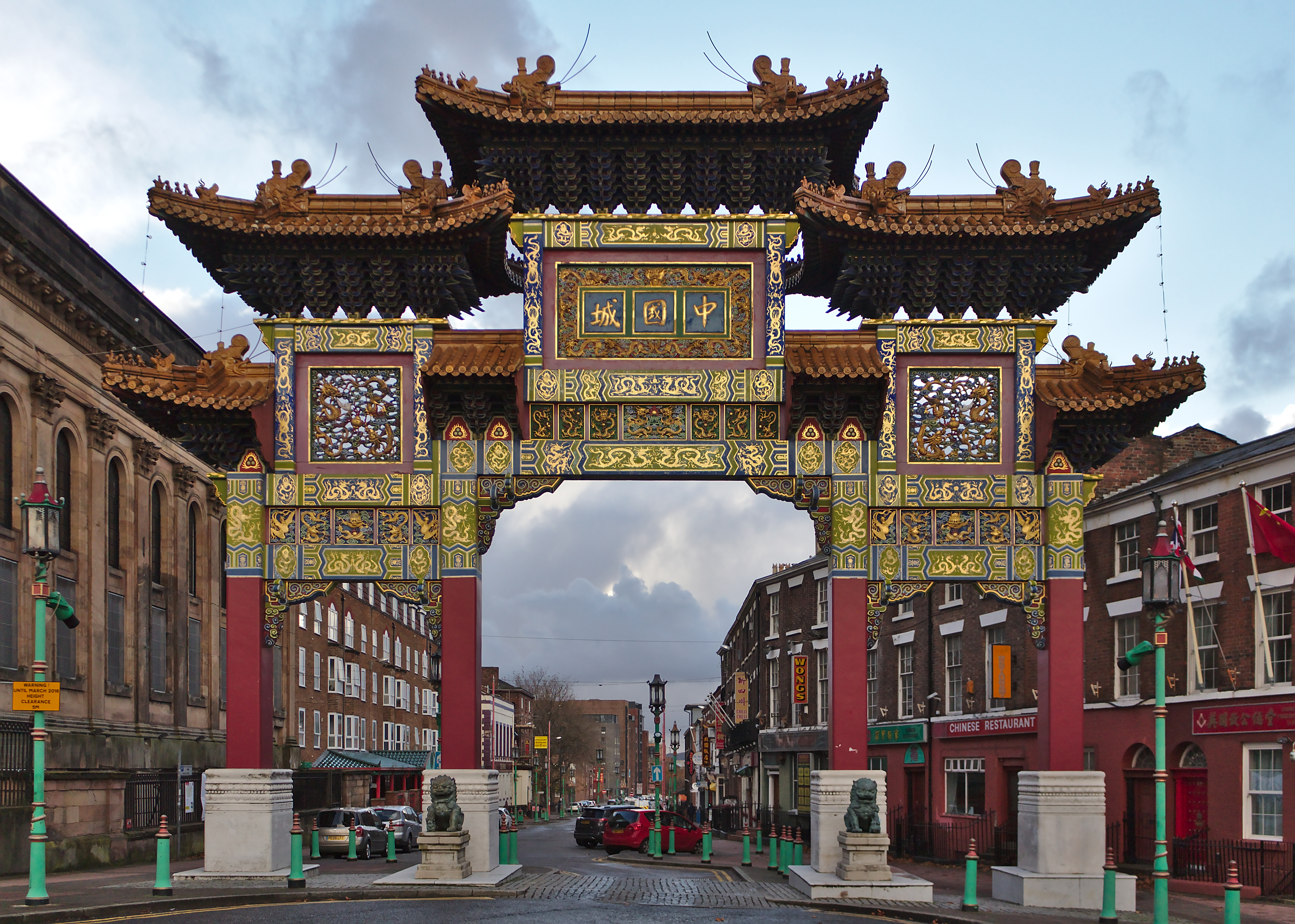
The gateway to the Chinatown in Liverpool

The Chinatown in Liverpool in the Merseyside area is on Duke Street and is home to the oldest Chinese community in Europe. It has been under regeneration. The arch located at the gateway is the largest of its kind outside of China.

==== Sheffield ====
Sheffield has no official Chinatown although London Road, Highfield is the centre of the Sheffield Chinese community. There are many Chinese restaurants, supermarkets and community stores, and the home of the Sheffield Chinese Community Centre. The Sheffield Chinese community is pressing for the street to be formally labelled Sheffield's Chinatown.

Planning permission was granted in 2015 for New Era Square, a mixed-use development located between St Mary's Gate, Bramall Lane and Sheldon Street (near to London Road) that media outlets dubbed "Sheffield's Chinatown". The £70 million development opened fully in May 2021 and consists of several residential and office buildings with ground floor retail centred around a pedestrianised square.

==== Leeds ====
Leeds has no official Chinatown, but the northeast area of the city centre is commonly referred to as Chinatown due to the presence of many longstanding Chinese restaurants, supermarkets and other commercial stores. The small "Chinatown" is centred on one of the city centre's major outdoor car parks, and the majority of Chinese establishments can be found either on the west side of the car park on Vicar Lane, or on the east side on Templar Lane and Templar Place.

Plans to develop the area into an official Chinatown, complete with Chinese gates, have been met with setbacks, mainly due to the wide dispersal of the city's Chinese community throughout the city and outlying suburbs. Furthermore, just as many if not more Chinese and other East Asian restaurants are to be found throughout the city centre, defeating the need for an official Chinatown.
