= Tang Frères =

Asian supermarket chain in Paris, France

Coordinates: 45.7706°N 4.8587°E

- Industry: supermarkets, catering, import-export, media
- Founded: 1976
- Headquarters: 163, bd Stalingrad, Vitry-sur-Seine (94400), France
- Area served: France, Laos
- Key people: Bounmy Rattanavan, Bou Rattanavan
- Revenue: 300 million euro (2024)
- Number of employees: 800

Tang Frères
- Traditional Chinese: 陳氏兄弟公司
- Simplified Chinese: 陈氏兄弟公司
- Literal meaning: Tang Brothers
Transcriptions
Standard Mandarin
- Hanyu Pinyin: Chénshì Xiōngdì Gōngsī

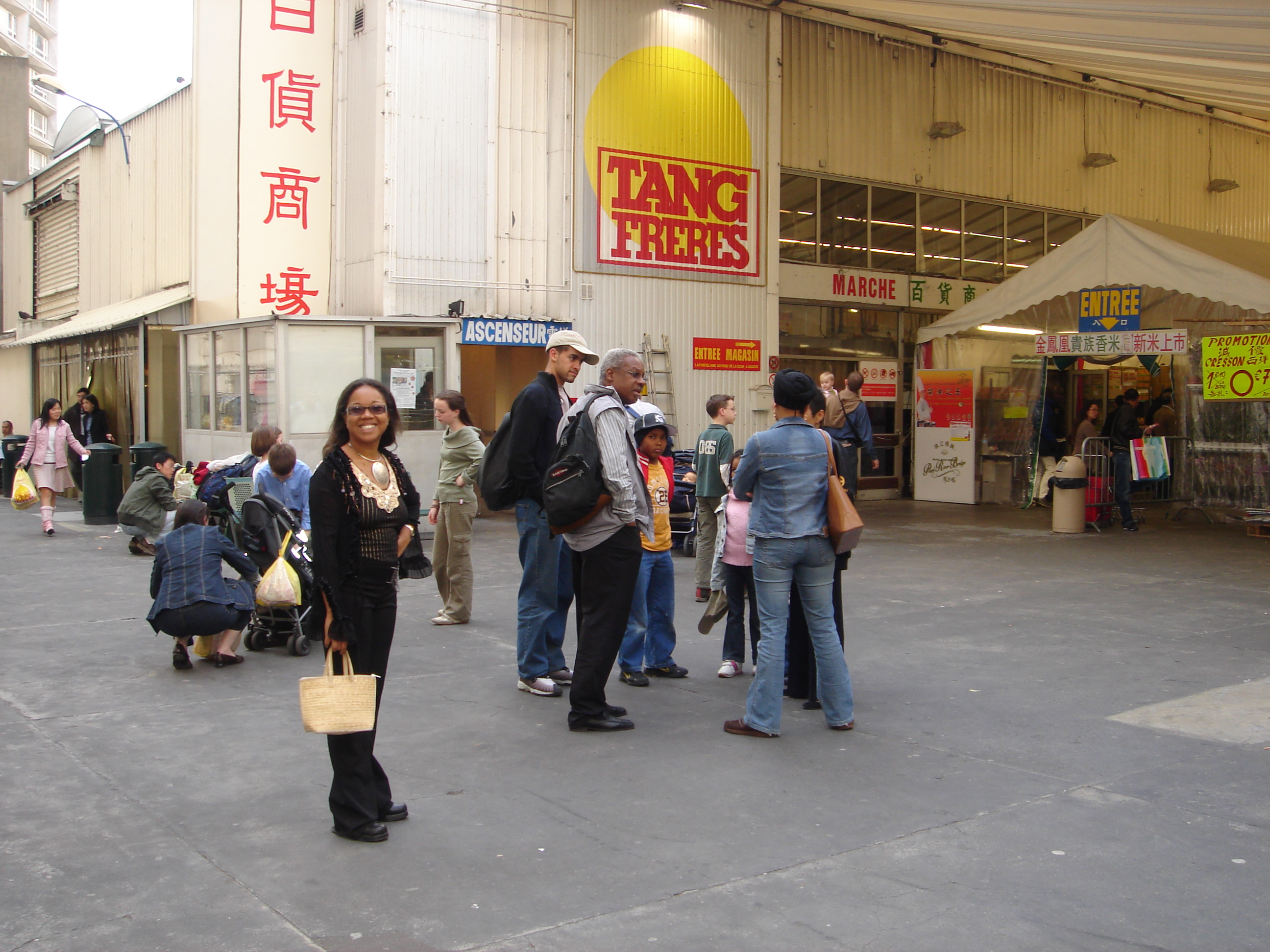
A supermarket of Tang Frères

Tang Frères ("Tang Brothers") is an Asian supermarket chain based in the 13th arrondissement of Paris, one of the quartier chinois (Chinatown) of the capital city of France.

Tang Frères is known as the biggest Asian supermarket chain west of China. The company has in fact diversified to other activities, including import of Asian DVDs and TV broadcasting. Tang Frères has several retail outlets throughout Paris and its immediate suburbs, as well as an outlet in Vientiane, the capital of Laos – the country of origin of the company's founding brothers.

Next to the Ivry's Tang Frères supermarket lies Paristore, another major Asian supermarket from France.
