= Chinatown, Milan =

Neighborhood of Milan, Italy

Coordinates: 45°28′53″N 9°10′36″E

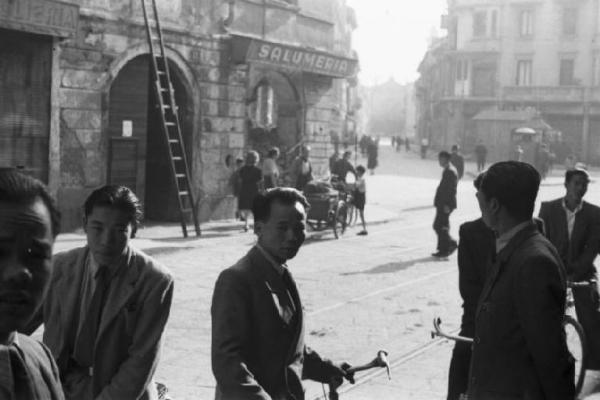
Chinatown, Milan in the 1940s

Chinatown in Milan is an ethnic enclave situated in the 8th quarter of Milan (Italy), and it is an important commercial district. It is the oldest and largest Chinese community in Italy, with about 21,000 people in 2011.

The Milanese Chinatown was originally established in via Canonica in the 1920s by immigrants from Wencheng County, in the Zhejiang province, and used to operate small textile and leather workshops.

Today the district is filled with hairdressing salons, fashion boutiques, silk and leather stores, libraries, traveling agencies, medicine centres and massage parlours. The Chinese takeaways and restaurants in the area are mostly specialised in Zhejiang cuisine. Several Italian-Chinese companies are also headquartered in the neighborhood, including the editorial desk of the newspaper Europe China Daily. Via Paolo Sarpi is the main street and is largely a pedestrian area. Other important locations are Via Bramante, Via Giovanni Battista Niccolini and Via Aleardo Aleardi.
