= Quartier asiatique =

Asian quarter of Paris, France

Coordinates: 48°49′20″N 02°21′55″E

- Chinese: 巴黎唐人街
Transcriptions
Standard Mandarin
- Hanyu Pinyin: Bālí tángrénjiē
Hakka
- Romanization: Baˊ liˇ tongˇ nginˇ gieˊ
Yue: Cantonese
- Yale Romanization: Bālàih Tòhngyàhngāai
- Jyutping: Ba1 lai4 tong4 yan4 gaai1

The Olympiades towers with the pagoda roof shopping centre.

The Quartier asiatique (French pronunciation: [kaʁtje azjatik], Asian Quarter), also called Triangle de Choisy ([tʁijɑ̃ɡl də ʃwazi]) or Petite Asie ([pətit azi]; Chinese: 巴黎唐人街, Vietnamese: Phố Tàu Paris) is the largest commercial and cultural center for the population of East Asian and Southeast Asian origin of Paris. It is located in the southeast of the 13th arrondissement in an area that contains many high-rise apartment buildings. Despite its status as a "Chinatown", the neighborhood also contains significant Vietnamese, Laotian and Cambodian populations.

== History ==
The first wave of Asian immigrants to the neighborhood consisted of ethnic Vietnamese refugees from the Vietnam War during the late 1970s. Later waves of migrants consisted of ethnic Chinese from Vietnam, Laos and Cambodia, who also fled their countries following their communist takeovers and to avoid persecution by the new governments. A significant number of the earlier Vietnamese immigrants integrated into French society shortly after their arrival, and began moving to other areas of Paris and the surrounding Île-de-France region, while still maintaining a commercial presence in the area. This left the neighborhood having a larger ethnic Chinese presence, and thus led to a creation of the present-day "Chinatown".

== Neighborhood ==
Plan of the Triangle de Choisy and Les Olympiades Triangle de Choisy Olympiades

The Quartier Asiatique forms an area roughly the shape of a triangle bounded by Avenue de Choisy, Avenue d'Ivry and Boulevard Masséna, as well as the Les Olympiades complex. Within this neighborhood, commercial activity is dominated by Chinese and Vietnamese businesses, with a smaller number of Laotian and Cambodian establishments. The large French Asian specialty market chains of Tang Frères and Paristore also have their flagship locations within the quarter. As the focal point for the Asian population of the Île-de-France region, a number of community organizations are headquartered here, helping to serve immigrant needs and cultural activities, especially for those from the former French Indochina. The annual Lunar New Year parade within the neighborhood is largest in Paris.

Unlike other Chinatowns in the Western world, Chinese architecture is not highly visible in the area, with an exception being the several Buddhist temples located throughout the district.

== Demographics ==
The Quartier Asiatique is the largest Chinatown in Europe, and unlike the diminutive but well-known Chinese district around Gerrard Street in London's Soho, it represents a significant population center as the result of very considerable immigration. The area is populated by nearly 50,000 people, largely of Chinese, Vietnamese and Laotian descent.

Originally an ethnic Vietnamese quarter, the Asian population in the area diversified in the 1980s as other ethnic groups from Indochina also settled in the district, the largest group being ethnic Chinese. While a large proportion of the neighborhood's earlier Vietnamese population assimilated into French society and moved to other areas of Paris, they still maintain a strong commercial and cultural presence in the district.

Languages used among immigrant groups in the community include the Chinese languages of Cantonese and Teochew, as well as Vietnamese, Lao and Khmer. Ethnic Chinese refugees are often conversant in one of the latter three languages in addition to their native Chinese dialect, due to their origins from Indochina.

== Similar communities ==
Paris also hosts three other Asiatic districts within its limits. The most notable is that of the Belleville neighborhood in the 20th arrondissement. Unlike Chinatown and the 13th arrondissement, ethnic Chinese from Indochina form a minority of the neighborhood's overall and Asian population. Ethnic groups from Indochina also do not have a significant presence in the Belleville community. Instead, the vast majority of Belleville's ethnic Chinese population consists of those with origins from the eastern Chinese coastal city of Wenzhou and surrounding southern Zhejiang province.

Meanwhile, the oldest but smallest Asian neighborhood in Paris is located in the 3rd arrondissement, near the Musée des Arts et Métiers. It is bounded roughly by Rue au Maire, Rue Volta, Rue du Temple and Rue des Gravilliers. The district was established in the early 1900s, when Chinese migrants specializing in the leather and Chinese porcelain industries arrived in Paris from the Wenzhou region. During World War I, a large number of Chinese laborers, also principally from Wenzhou, were recruited by France to help with war efforts in the country. The small number who decided to stay in France after the war also settled in the district.

SInce the 1990s, a Japanese quarter has been developing along Rue Sainte-Anne in the 1st arrondissement near the Pyramides Métro station. The area hosts a number of Japanese restaurants and specialty boutiques, along with branch offices of the Japan National Tourism Organization and Japan Airlines. In recent years, a Korean presence has also been established in the same area.

== Gallery ==
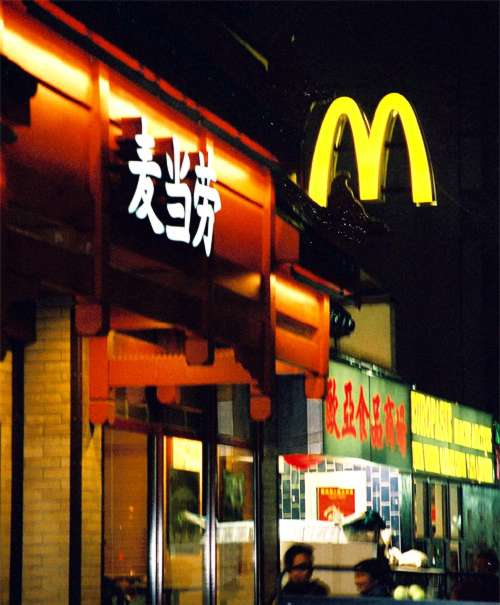
Mix of culture in the Triangle de Choisy.

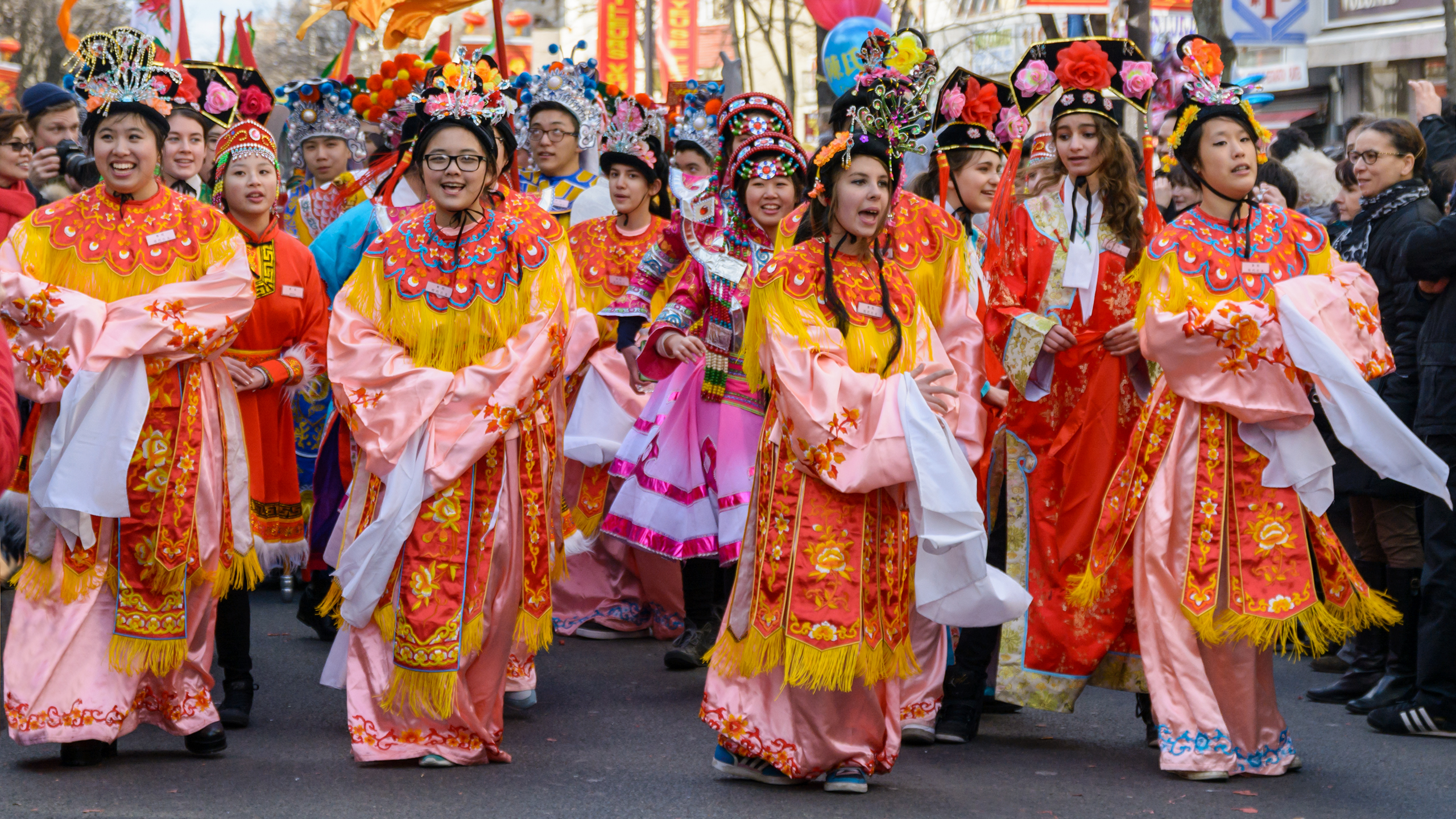
Chinese New Year parade in 2015.

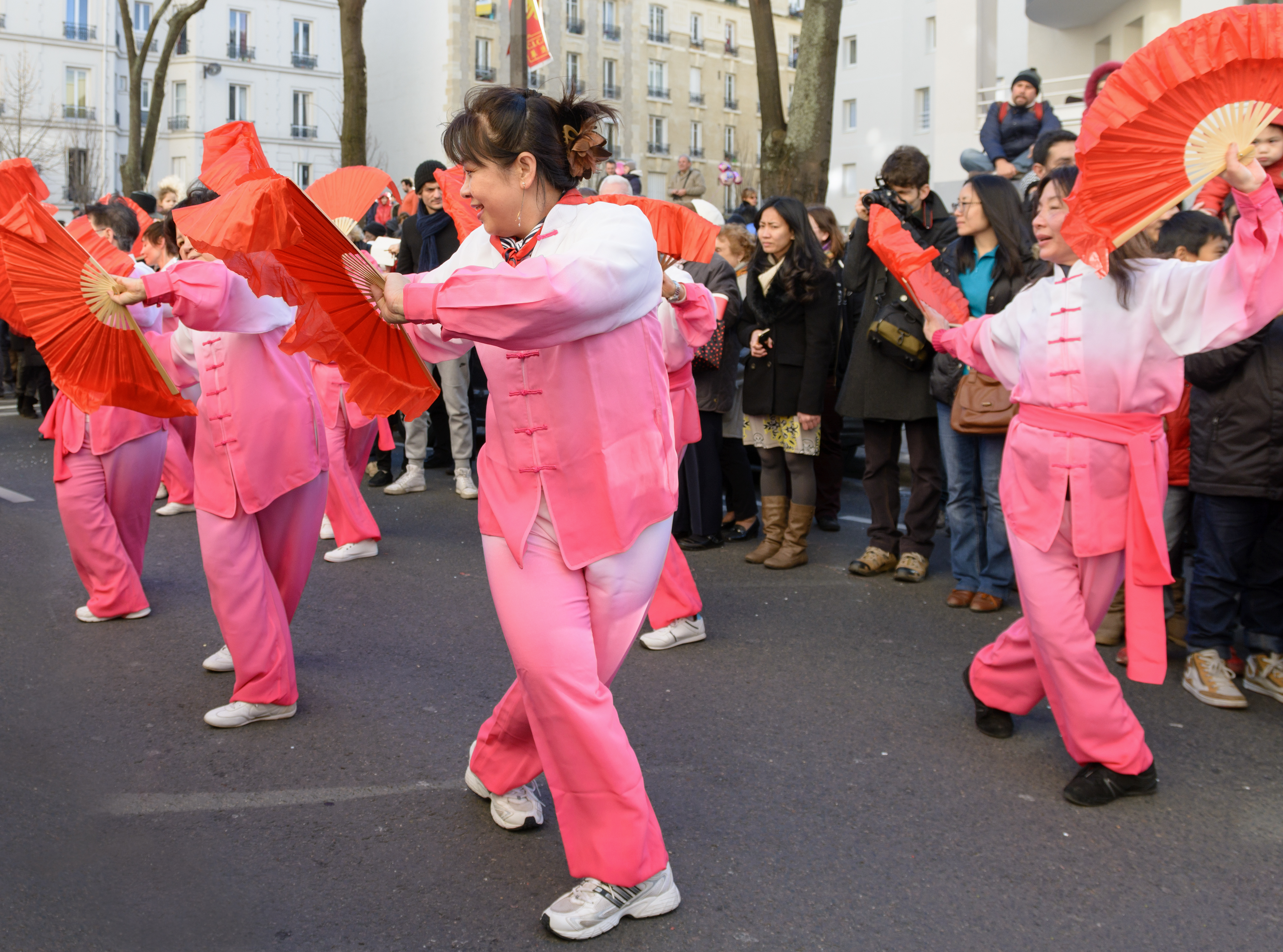
Chinese New Year parade.

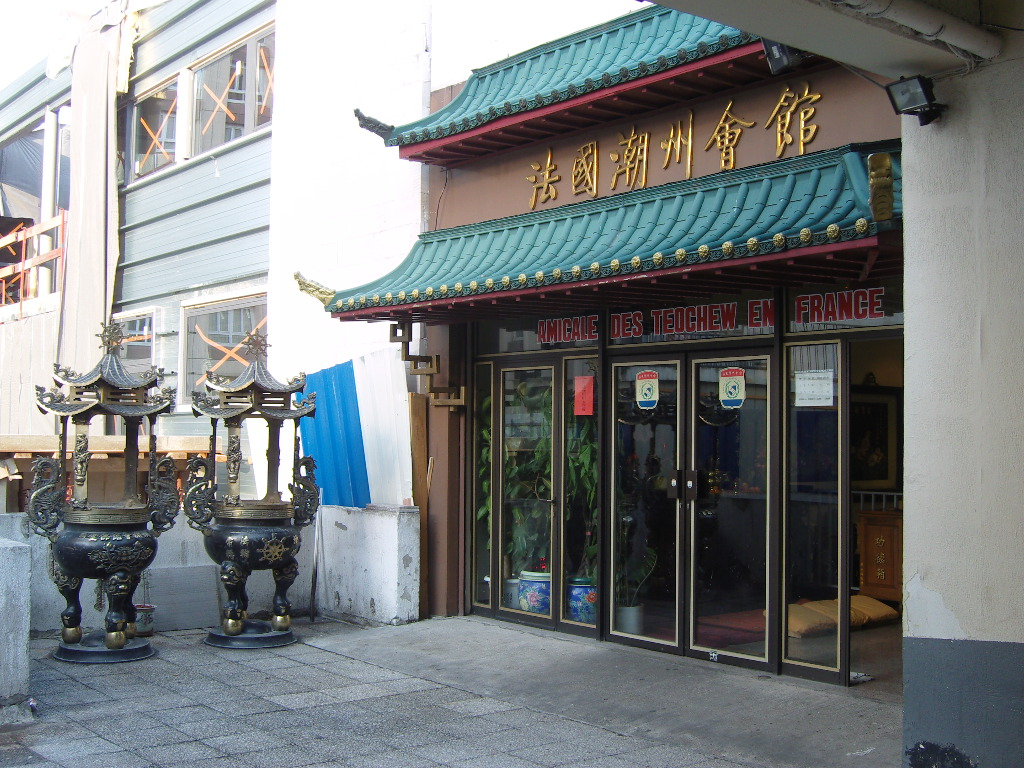
Teochew Association in France.

== See also ==
- Belleville, Paris
- Chinese diaspora in France
- Vietnamese people in France
