= Via Paolo Sarpi =

Street in Milan, Italy

Coordinates: 45°28′53″N 9°10′36″E

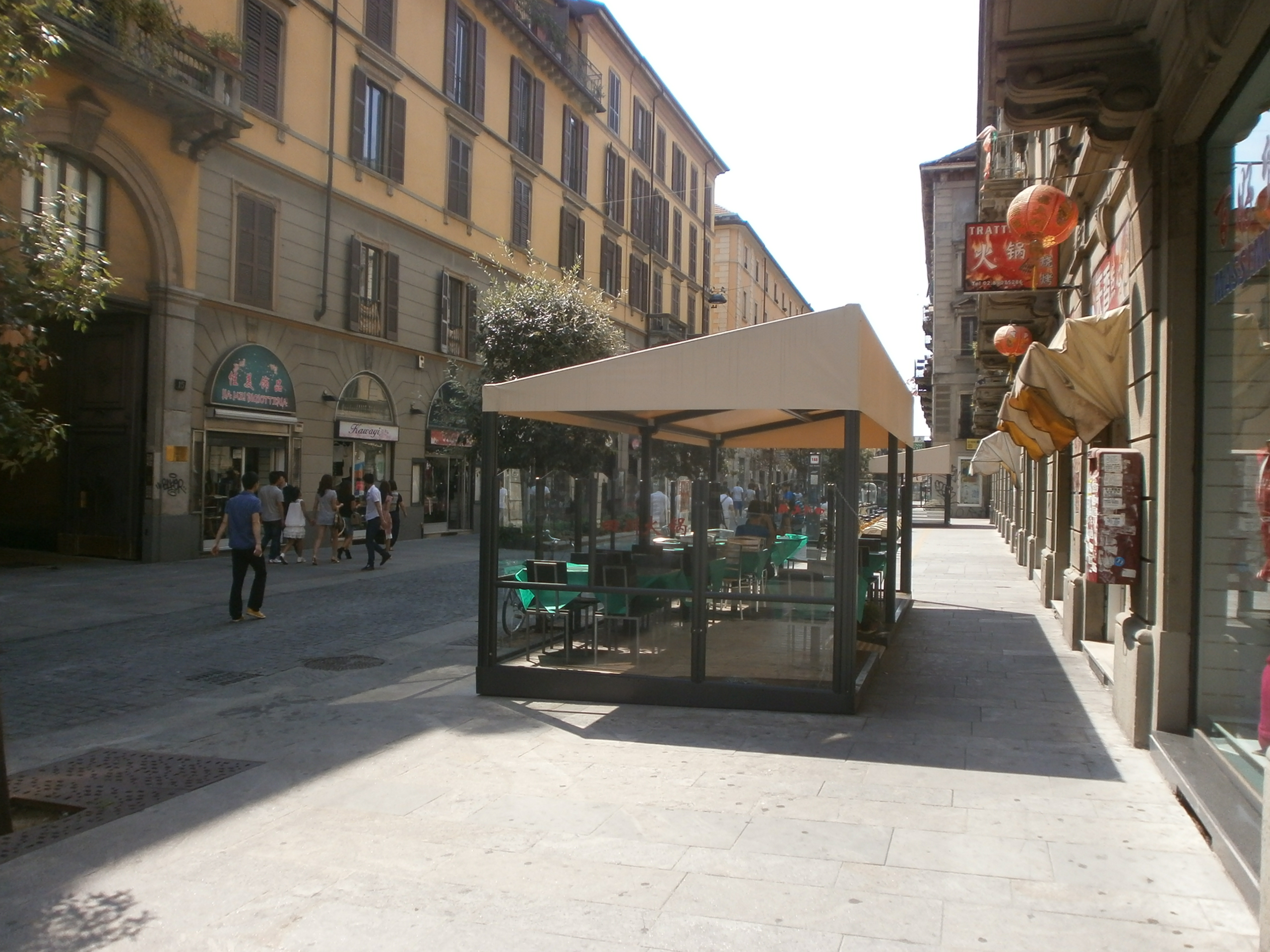
Via Paolo Sarpi, Milan.

Via Paolo Sarpi is a street in Milan, Italy, known to be the center of the city's Chinese community (Chinatown). It is situated in the 8th district and it is an important commercial avenue. The street is named after Paolo Sarpi, a 16th century Venetian polymath.

Today, the street is filled with hairdressing salons, fashion boutiques, silk and leather stores, libraries, traveling agencies and medicine centers.
