= Paris Store =

Asian supermarket in France

Coordinates: 48.7492°N 2.3827°E

- Industry: supermarkets, import-export
- Founded: 1977
- Headquarters: 44 Avenue d'Ivry 75013 Paris
- Area served: France
- Website: http://www.paris-store.com/

Paris Store
- Traditional Chinese: 巴黎士多集團
- Simplified Chinese: 巴黎士多集团
Transcriptions
Standard Mandarin
- Hanyu Pinyin: Bālí shìduō jítuán

Paris Store or Paristore is an Asian supermarket situated in France in the regions of Paris, Lyon, Marseille, Roubaix, Strasbourg, Toulouse, and Tours that sells Chinese, Japanese, Korean, Thai, Vietnamese, and Reunionese food products. It has more than 20 branches, including one in the 13th arrondissement of Paris, situated near Tang Frères, another supermarket selling Asian food.
