= La Défense de Paris =

Sculpture by Louis-Ernest Barrias

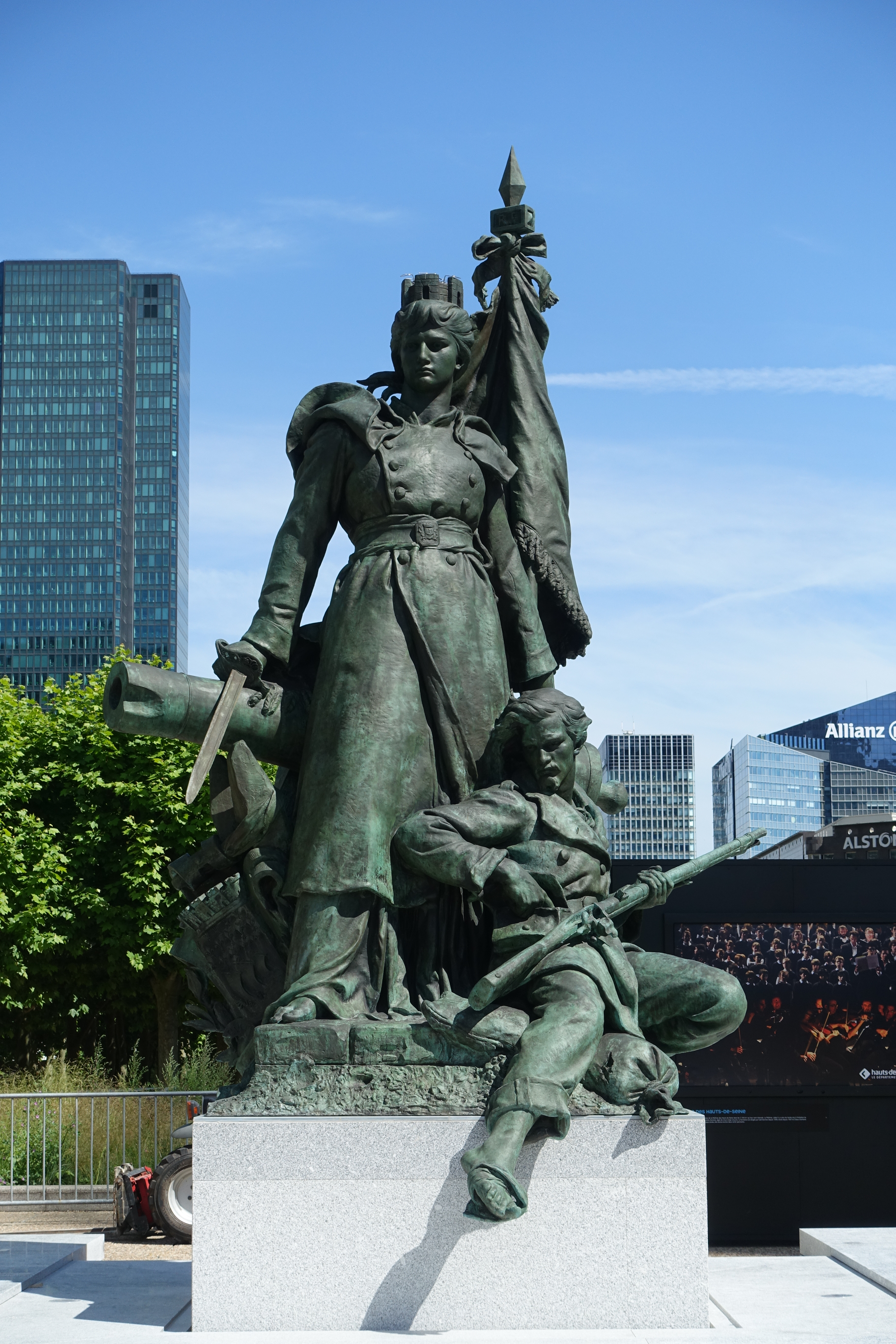
La Défense de Paris in 2017

La Défense de Paris is a bronze statue by French sculptor Louis-Ernest Barrias. It commemorates the French dead from the Siege of Paris in 1870–71, during the Franco-Prussian War. The sculpture group was unveiled to the west of Paris on 12 October 1883, erected on an existing plinth that had previously supported a bronze sculpture of Napoleon by Charles Émile Seurre, alongside the crossroads between Courbevoie and Puteaux. The location became the La Défense roundabout, but the statue was later removed. The surrounding area was subsumed into Paris as the city expanded later in the 19th and in the 20th centuries; the area became known as La Défense after the statue. The statue was removed to a new location about 1965, and then moved several times before it was placed at its current location near the Arche de la Défense in 2017.

== Background ==
The Republican government that came to power in France in 1879 was determined to commemorate the defence of France and Paris during the Franco-Prussian War nearly a decade earlier, when the collapse of the Second Empire had led to the foundation of the Third Republic. The statue was also intended to mark the reintegration of the city of Paris into the French nation after the radical socialist insurrection of the Paris Commune in 1871.

It was one of several patriotic sculptures commissioned during the first few decades of the Third French Republic, such as Rodin's Burghers of Calais and Jules Dalou's Triumph of the Republic, both from the 1880s.

The government of the Seine department organised a competition for a monument to be erected at the crossroads of Courbevoie, at the far end of the Avenue de Neuilly, on the extended alignment of the Axe historique from the Louvre, through the Tuileries to the Place de la Concorde, then along the Champs-Élysées to the Arc de Triomphe, along the Avenue de la Grande-Armée to the Porte Maillot, and along the Avenue de Neuilly (now the Avenue Charles-de-Gaulle) to the Pont de Neuilly . The location for the statue was the place where soldiers of the French National Guard were assembled before the Battle of Buzenval on 19 January 1871, in the last effort of the defenders to break out of the siege of Paris.

Proposals were sought from around 100 French artists, including Gustave Doré, Auguste Bartholdi, Albert-Ernest Carrier-Belleuse, Alfred Boucher, Alexandre Falguière and Auguste Rodin, but the jury awarded the project to Louis-Ernest Barrias. His plaster model was shown at the Paris Salon in 1881.

A casting of Rodin's rejected proposal, L'Appel aux armes ("The Call to Arms"), has been shown in the garden of the Musée Rodin since 1937. This sculpture was selected in 1916 for a memorial to the Battle of Verdun: a version enlarged to four times the original size was unveiled at Verdun on 1 August 1920.

== Description ==
Barrias designed a sculptural group of three figures to symbolise the defence of Paris in the Franco-Prussian War: a woman standing in the uniform of the National Guard and with a mural crown on her head, leaning on a cannon and holding a flag, symbolises the city of Paris; on the ground in front, a young soldier loading his Chassepot rifle represents the service of the military; and to the rear, a sad young woman represents the suffering of the civil population. Barrias used a similar triple composition for his Franco-Prussian war memorial sculpture in Saint-Quentin, Aisne.

A plaster preparatory model, c.1880, patinated to resemble bronze, is exhibited at the Petit Palais. The statue was cast in bronze by founder Henri Léon Thiébault. It is 5.5 m (18 ft) high and weighs 3.5 t (3.4 long tons; 3.9 short tons).

It was mounted on a tall plinth that was already in place, and which had previously supported a Statue of Napoleon by Charles Émile Seurre, which had itself been erected atop the Colonne Vendôme from 1833 to 1863, until moved to Puteaux as the centrepiece of the new Rond-Point de l’Empereur. The statue of Napoleon was removed in 1870 and lost into the River Seine (whether by the Prussians or by Parisians, accidentally or deliberately, is unclear); it was recovered from the river some months later, and has been displayed at the Hôtel des Invalides since 1911.

== Reception ==
The statue was unveiled on 12 August 1883 by Pierre Waldeck-Rousseau, French Minister of the Interior, with a 21 gun salute and a military parade, observed by an audience estimated at 100,000. The statue was originally mounted on a granite plinth behind iron railings with four gas lanterns.

The commune of Courbevoie became known as La Défense after the sculpture, and is at the heart of the Defense business district, developed from the 1950s and which also spreads into the neighbouring communes of Nanterre and Puteaux. The buildings of the Établissement public pour l'aménagement de la région de la Défense (EPAD) and the Centre des nouvelles industries et technologies (CNIT) were constructed nearby from 1958, with early examples including the Nobel Tower and the Esso Tower.

The statue was moved several times during the expansion of La Défense. The statue was moved in 1965 to a different plinth nearby, and was removed for several years during the development of the La Défense business district and the building of La Défense station of RER line A, until it was again reinstalled on 21 September 1983, almost 100 years after it was originally unveiled. It moved to a new more visible location in 2017, near the Arche de la Défense.

== Gallery ==
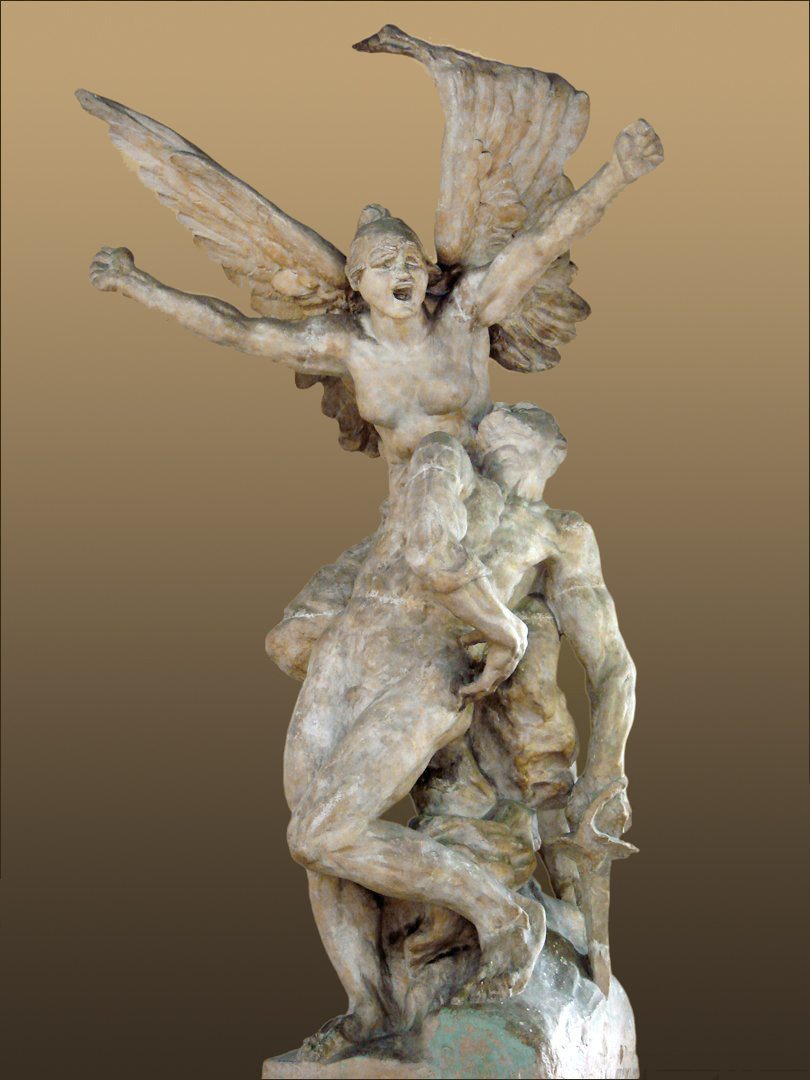
Auguste Rodin's rejected proposal for La Défense, known as L'Appel aux armes ("The Call to Arms")

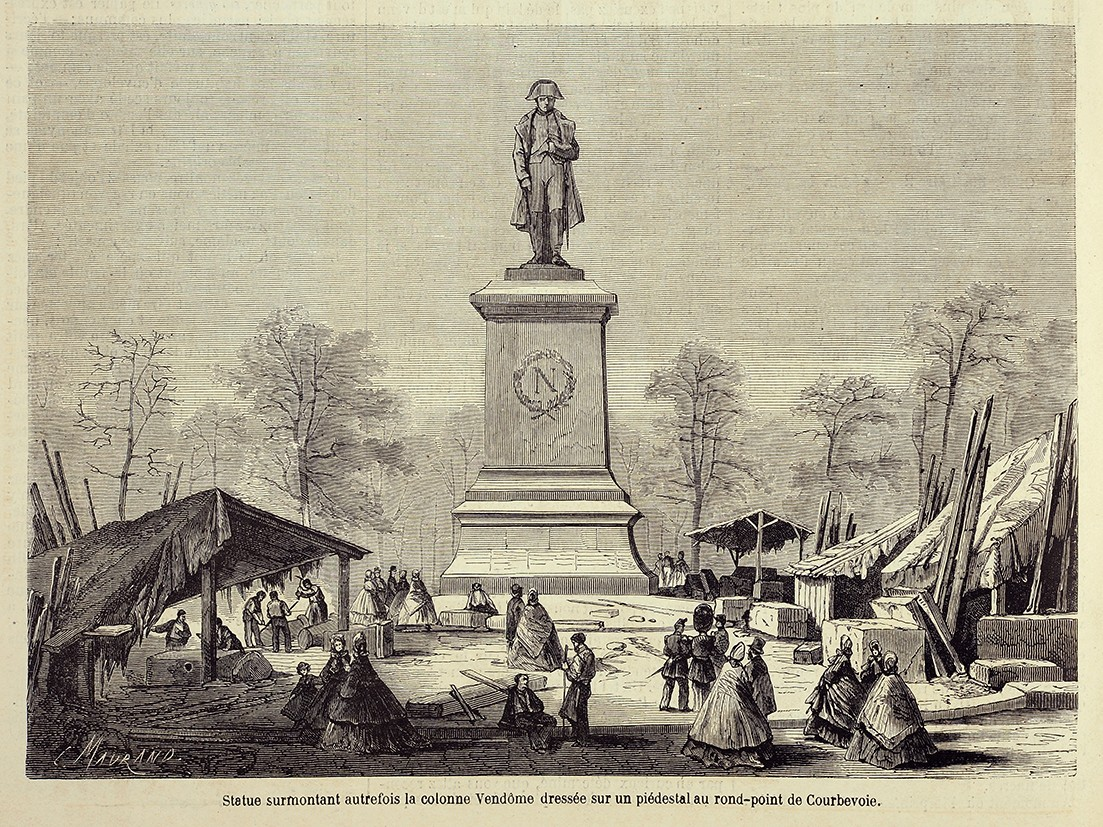
Statue of Napoleon by Charles Émile Seurre, with the plinth reused by Barrias

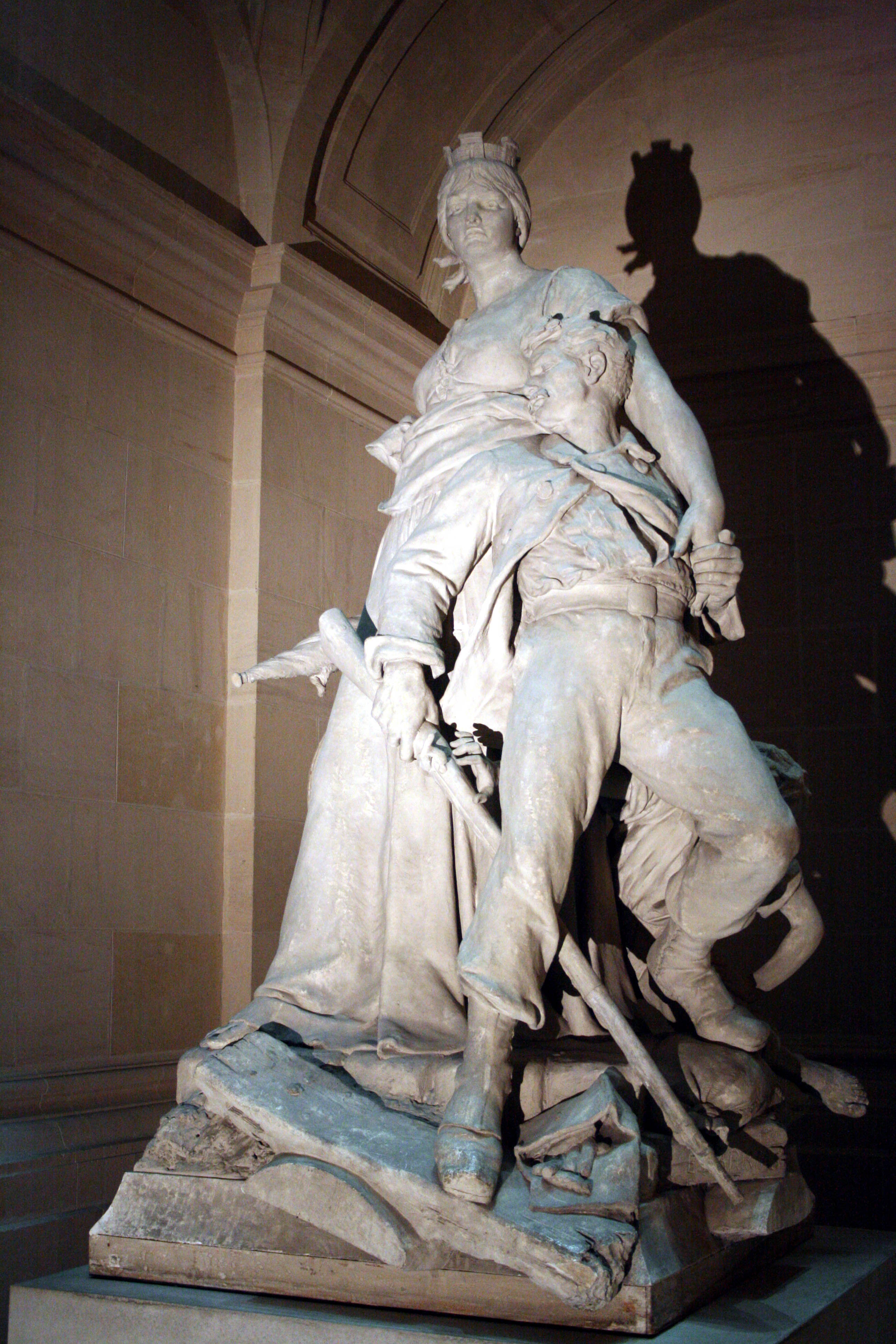
Monument de la défense de Saint-Quentin

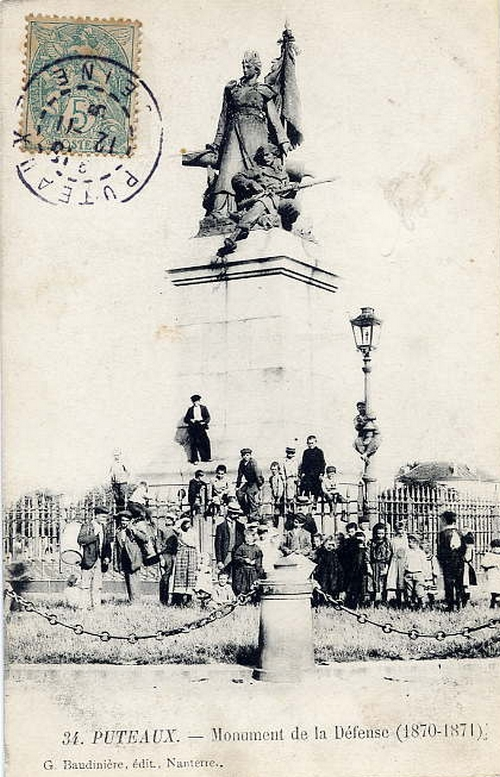
La Défense de Paris at its original location, c. 1910, on the reused plinth

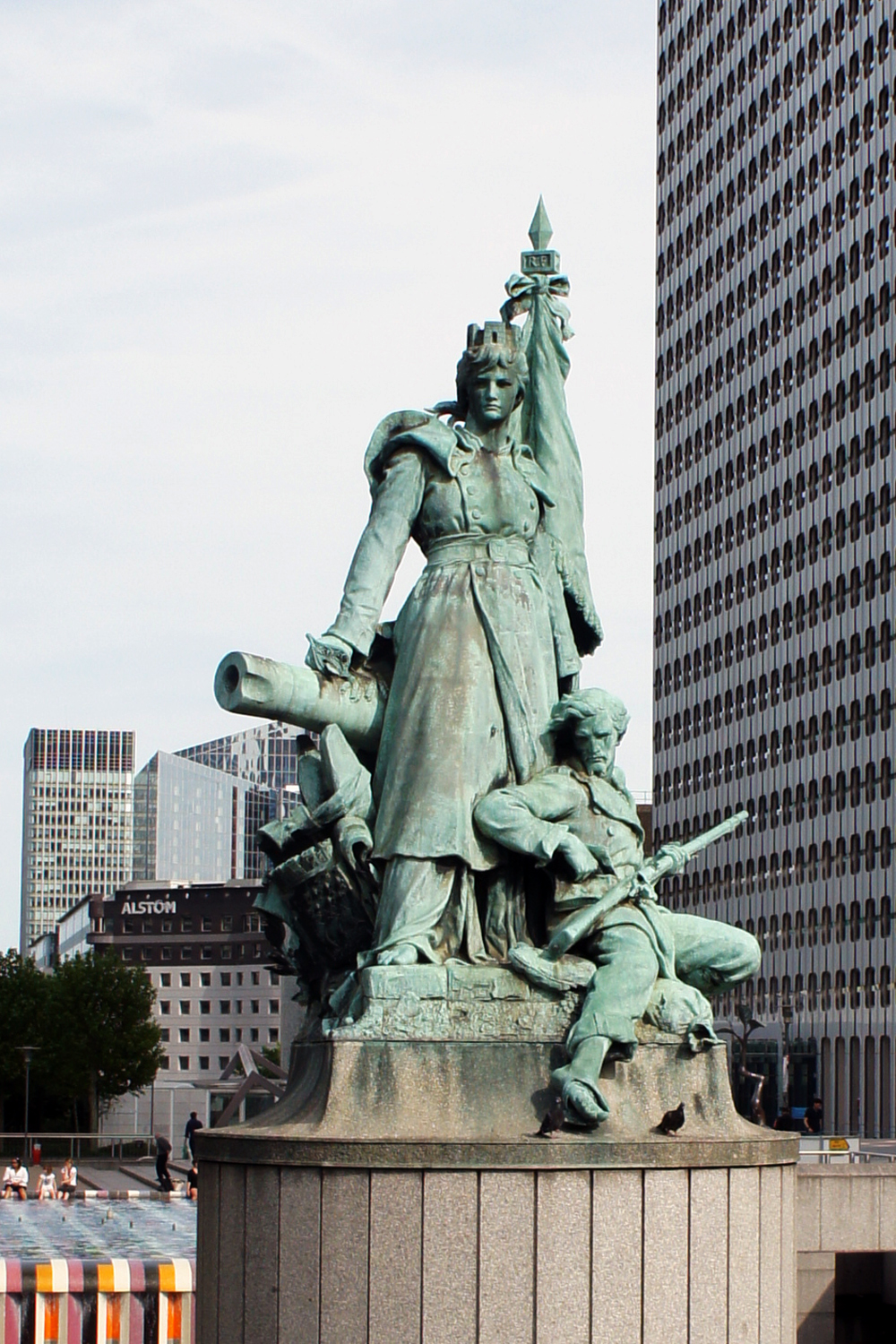
La Défense de Paris, on a new plinth in 2012

The statue in 2014, near La Grande Arche de la Défense
