= Hermitage Plaza =

- Interactive map of the Hermitage Plaza area

General information
- Status: Proposed
- Type: mixed use
- Location: La Défense (Courbevoie, France)
- Cost: €2,800,000,000

Height
- Antenna spire: 320 m (1,050 ft)
- Roof: 320 m (1,050 ft)

Technical details
- Floor count: 86
- Floor area: ~250,000 m^{2} (2,700,000 sq ft)

Design and construction
- Architect: Foster and Partners
- Developer: Hermitage
- Structural engineer: Leslie E. Robertson Associates

Hermitage Plaza is a project consisting of a podium and six buildings, including two towers, proposed by Hermitage Group for the Paris-La Défense business district. If completed beyond 2027, the two 320-metre (1,050 ft) tall towers with 86 floors will be the tallest buildings in the European Union. Since 2023, the project has been suspended.

== Concept ==
Hermitage Plaza is a mixed-use project at the entrance of Europe's biggest central business district — La Défense in Paris — and is situated across the Seine River from the residential district of Neuilly-Paris. It would bring together programs of luxury serviced apartments, a 5-Star palace hotel, class-A offices, high-end retail, and the public and entertainment space. Placed along Paris' historical axis, linking the Louvre Palace, and its crystal pyramid, to the Arc de Triomphe and the Grande Arche of La Défense, Hermitage Plaza would be visible from every corner of the capital.

The shape of the Hermitage Plaza would be divided into two distinct volumes. The genesis of this design is the will to create optimum permeability of the site at ground level whilst maximizing the views from each of the two towers, as well as preserving views from the neighboring buildings. The design incorporates a number of distinguishing features such as:

- The principal load-bearing columns are up to 8 metres apart, as opposed to the more conventional 6 metres found in contemporary tower structures.
- An entirely automated pantograph system will be used to open the windows, allowing direct natural air circulation in the rooms, which is a real innovation for skyscrapers.
- The technical rooms, usually placed on the roof, have been inserted in strategic floors (so that the pool's underlying structure would not diminish ceiling heights on any inhabitable floors) in order to provide breath-taking terraces and views to the top-floor luxury penthouses.
- The triple-glazed façade grid framework is 1.75m wide, thus replacing commonly used 1.35m.

The project inscribed itself within the Paris-La Défense renewal plan, initiated and driven by the EPADESA (local planning authorities).

== History of the project ==
The project was managed by Emin Iskenderov, a Russian property developer. The project was revealed by Norman Foster, on 11 March 2009 at the MIPIM (real estate show for professionals) which took place in Cannes, France. Hermitage Group had originally proposed a different design, by Jacques Ferrier, which was running for the Tour Signal contest. The Tour Signal contest was won by Jean Nouvel's project but Hermitage Group tried to have its towers built anyway. This was possible because Tour Signal's location was free and Ferrier's project was not planned to be at the same location as Nouvel's from the beginning. However Hermitage Group and Ferrier were soon at odds over undisclosed points and Ferrier left the project; Hermitage then announced it would order a new design from Norman Foster, which became the currently known one.

The Hermitage Plaza will be sited over the riverfront end of Les Damiers, a residential estate of four Brutalist towers constructed in 1976; three sections closest to the riverfront, the Anjou and Bretagne towers and Infra lowrise, are slated to be demolished to make way for the project. Hermitage SAS had claimed to have secured the financing of the project. As of March 2024, the Hermitage Plaza Project is still ongoing and its construction permits are valid until May 2026.
