= Tour Generali =

- Interactive map of the Tour Generali area

General information
- Status: Never built
- Location: La Défense (Courbevoie, France)
- Coordinates: 48°53′22″N 2°14′57″E
- Construction started: not started

Height
- Antenna spire: 265 m (869 ft), originally 319 m (1,047 ft)

Technical details
- Floor count: 46
- Floor area: 90,000.00 m^{2} (968,751.9 sq ft)

Design and construction
- Architect: Valode & Pistre
- Main contractor: Vinci

Tour Generali (English: Generali Tower) was a skyscraper planned for construction in the business quarter of La Défense in Courbevoie (Hauts-de-Seine, France). (Generali owns another prominent high-rise building on Avenue Louise in Brussels, which is also known locally as the "Tour Generali".)

The project was officially initiated on 18 October 2006 for Italian insurance company Assicurazioni Generali. Part of the modernisation of La Défense, the project was being constructed by Vinci on the old site of the Iris building, which was completed in 1983. Tour Generali would have an estimated height of 319 meters (1100 feet) from ground level, at a total cost estimate of 500 million euros. An international competition organised by Generali, Epad, and Vinci Immobilier selected Valode & Pistre as the architects.

The building would have had 400 m^{2} (4,300 sq ft) of PV cells, 800 m^{2} (8,600 sq ft) of solar panels, and 18 axial wind turbines on site to produce energy. Other environmental initiatives in the project included mixed-mode ventilation with night purging, use of thermal mass, district heating/cooling, and multi-service chilled beams (e.g. for ventilation, cooling, heating, and lighting).

This building was to be constructed as a "green" building, and would have included wind turbines in its spire, solar panels, and other environmentally friendly elements.

The main entrance of the tower would have been at the 6th level of the tower along the elevated esplanade/promenade, which rises 18 metres (59 ft) above ground level.

The mayor of Courbevoie, Jacques Kossowski, refused to approve the first request for a building permit, describing it as imprecise and contrary to city requirements. While a revised application for a permit was approved, it faced objections from an association of local residents and the companies behind two nearby towers, saying that the Tour Generali would block their views.

The Tour Generali had undergone a redesign and was shortened to 265 m (869 ft), which meant it would have no longer held the title of the tallest building in the European Union. The project was cancelled in 2011.

== See also ==
- List of tallest structures in Paris
- Phare Tower
- Tour First
- Tour Signal
