= Tour Saint-Gobain =

Office skyscraper in La Défense, Courbevoie, France

- Interactive map of the Tour Saint-Gobain area

General information
- Type: Office
- Architectural style: Modern
- Location: 12 Place de l'Iris, La Défense, Paris
- Coordinates: 48°53′23″N 2°14′58″E
- Construction started: 2016
- Completed: 2019
- Owner: Generali

Height
- Roof: 178 m (584 ft)

Technical details
- Floor count: 44
- Floor area: 48,900 m^{2} (526,000 sq ft)

Design and construction
- Architect: Valode & Pistre
- Developer: Hines
- Structural engineer: Terrell Group
- Main contractor: Vinci SA

Website
- Official website

The Saint-Gobain Tower (also known as the Tour M2) is an office skyscraper in the Courbevoie commune of the La Défense district in Paris. Built between 2016 and 2019, the tower stands at 178 m (584 ft) tall with 44 floors and is the 17th tallest building in Paris.

== History ==
After the abandonment of the Tour Generali project, an architectural project planned to reach 265 meters in height, Italian insurance company Generali, the landowner, developed a new, more modest tower project that would become Saint-Gobain's headquarters planned as the M2 Tower. Demolition of the existing Iris building and construction of the tower began in the summer of 2016.

The foundation stone of the site was laid on April 19, 2017, by Pierre-André de Chalendar, Chairman and CEO of Saint-Gobain, Gabriele Galateri di Genola, Chairman of Generali, and Xavier Huillard, Chairman and CEO of Vinci SA.

The construction of this tower will lead to the abandonment of the old offices serving as headquarters for the mirror company, on the other side of the circular Boulevard of La Défense. The building displays a glazed-surface volume consisting of the last floors, which can be accessed directly from the workspaces. It was designed to feature greenhouses and freespaces for panoramic views. The mai npurpose was the development of living conditions in a high-rise building.

== Construction site chronology ==
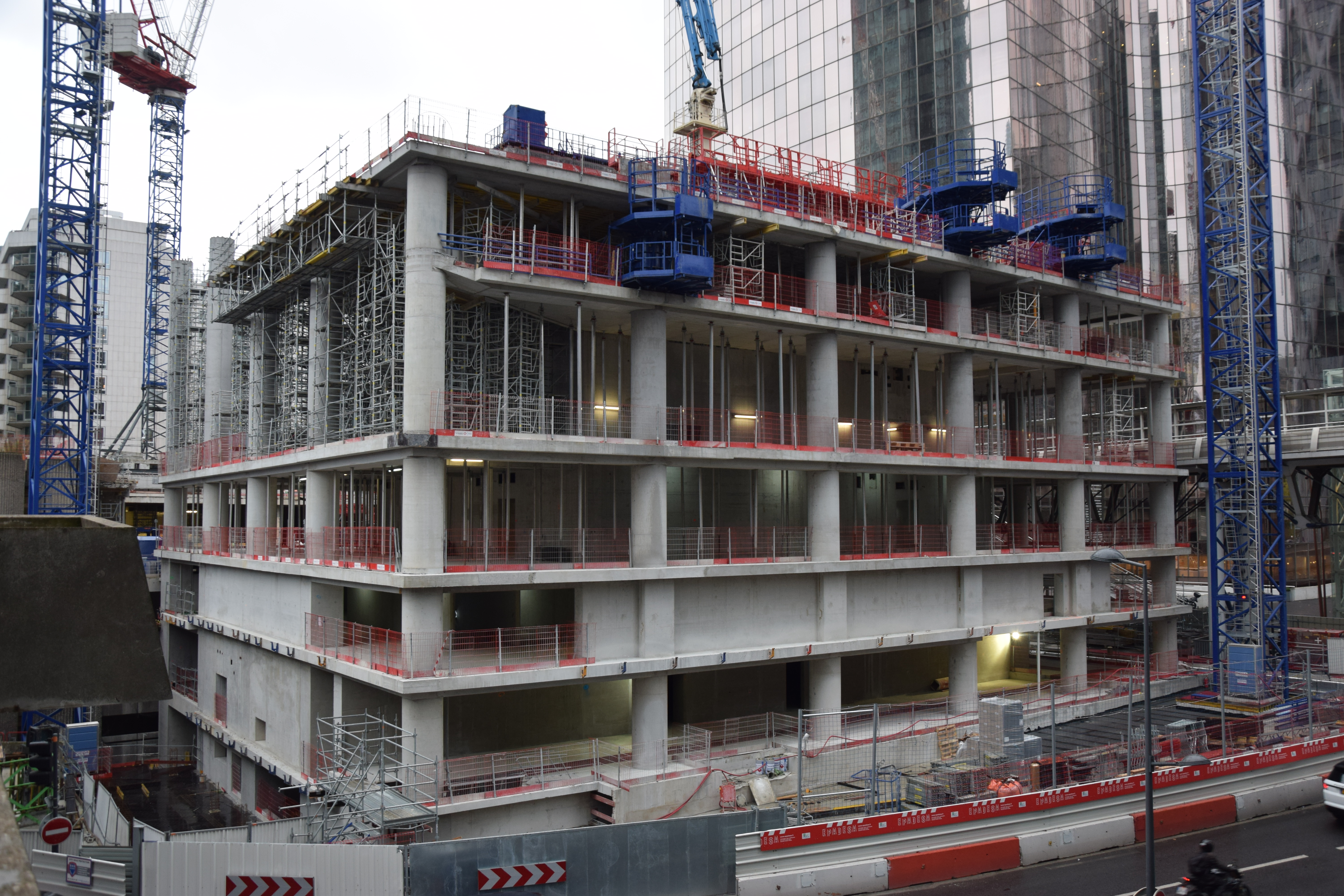
August 30, 2017

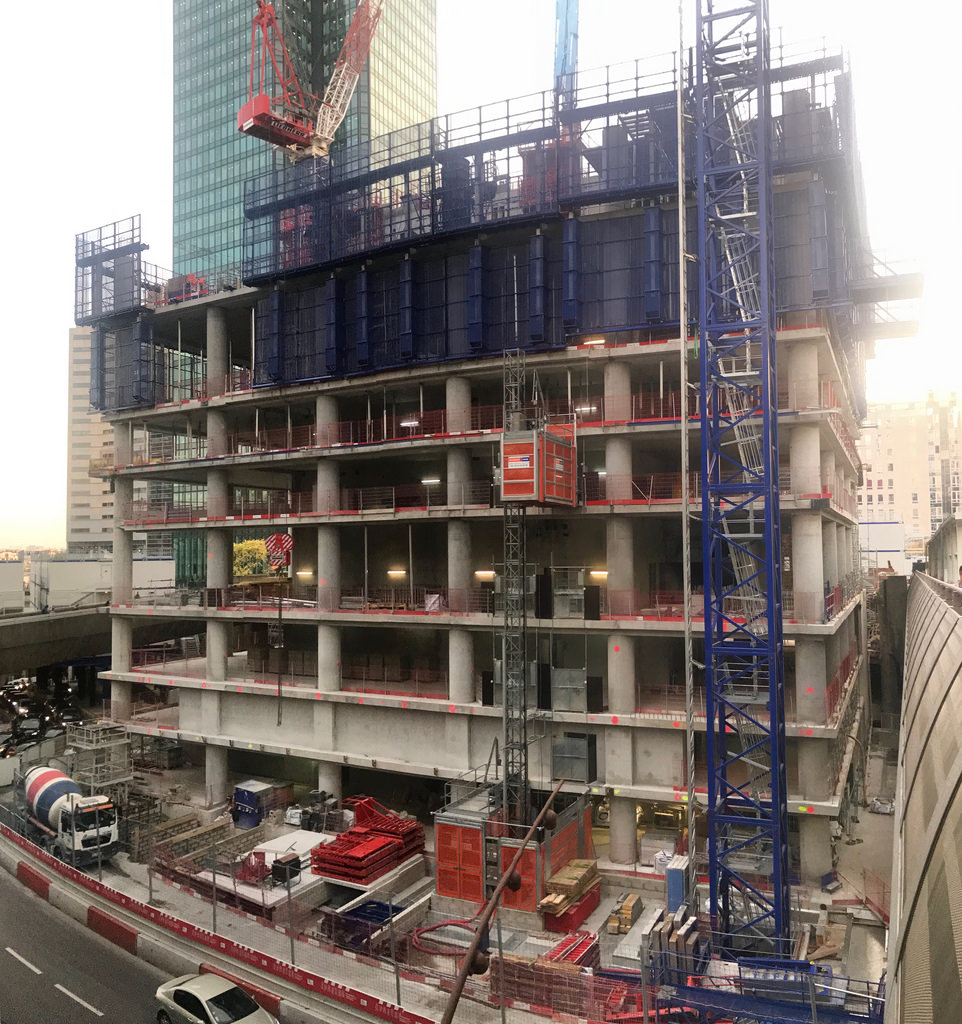
October 17, 2017

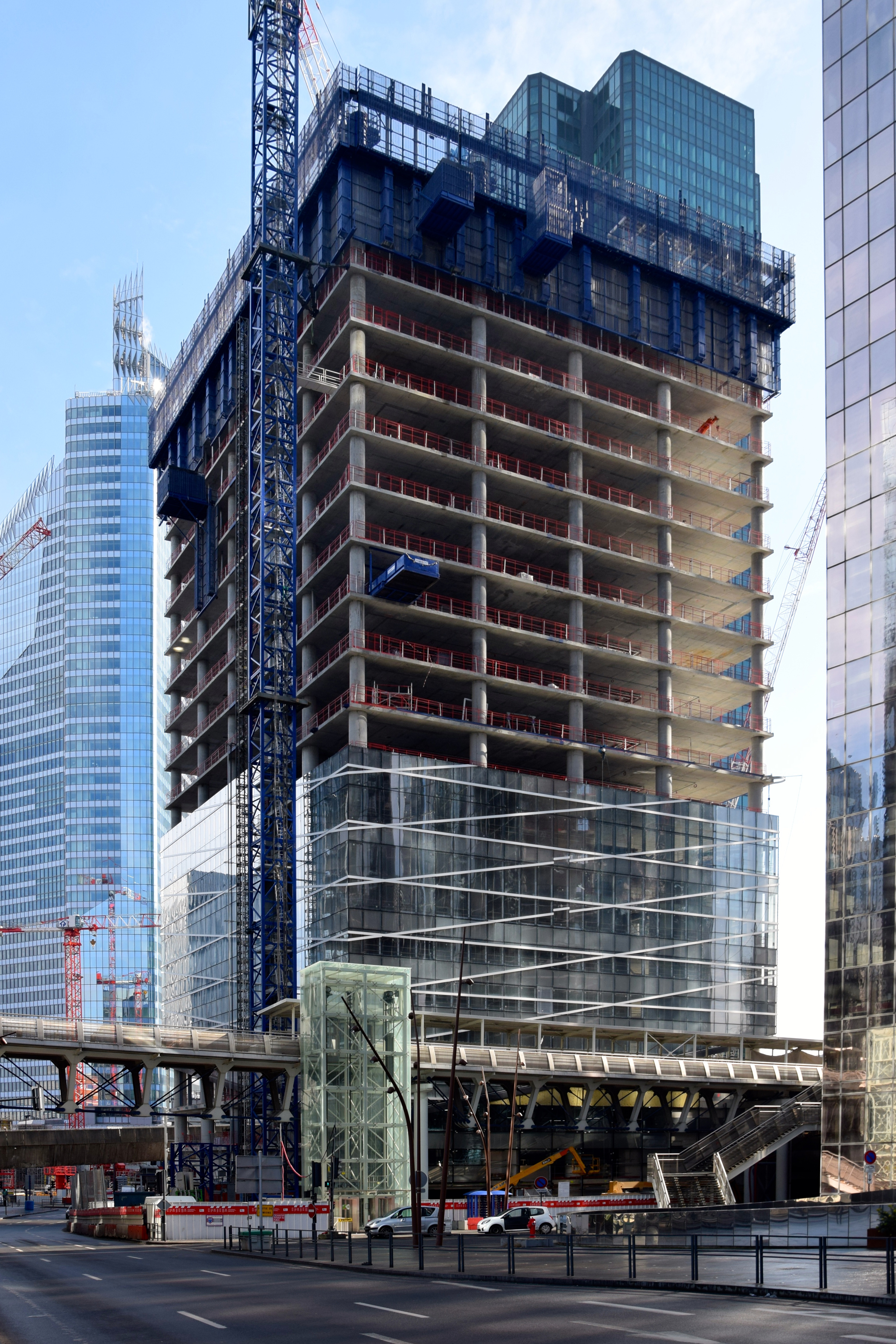
March 3, 2018

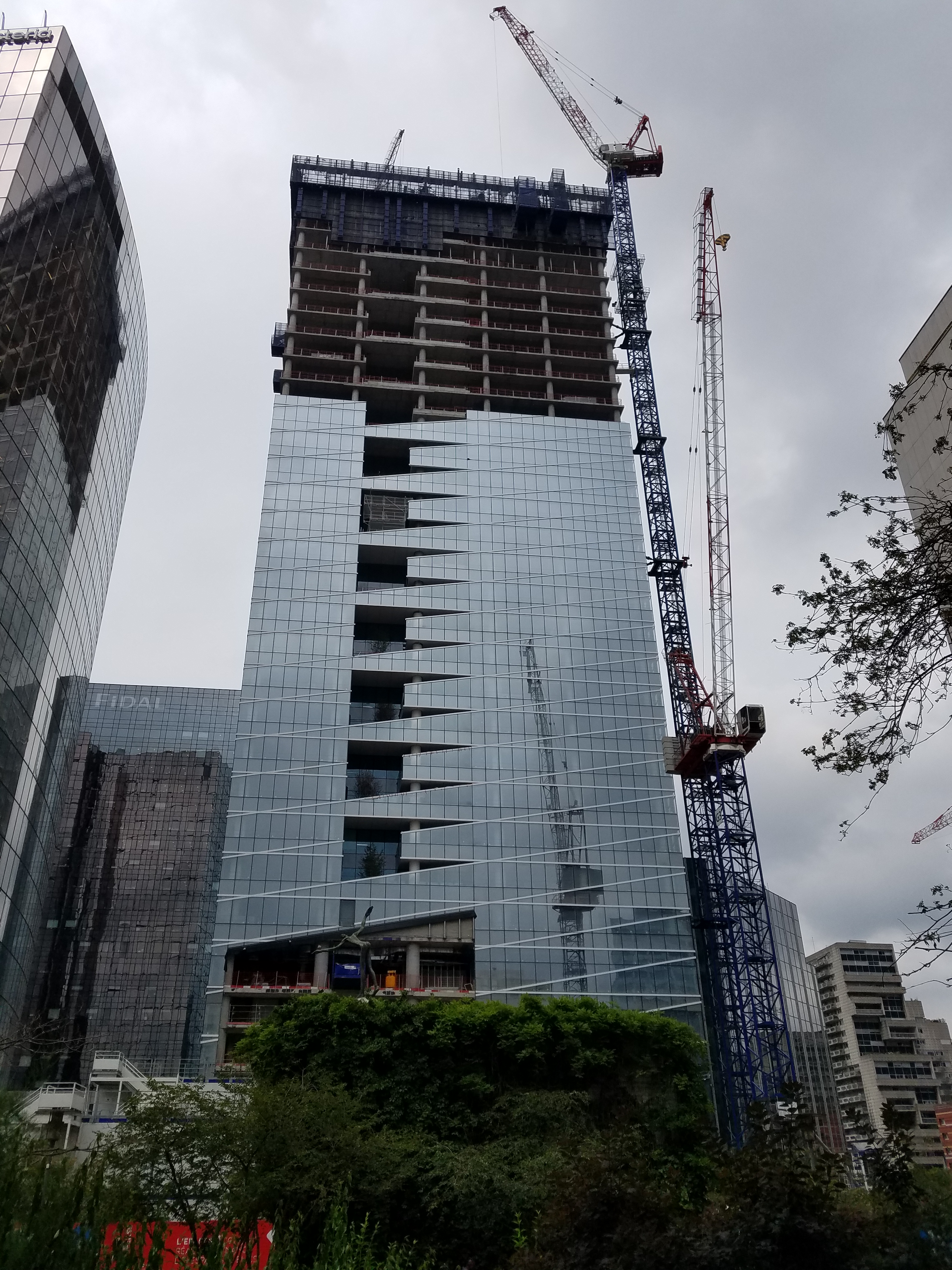
July 20, 2018

== See also ==
- List of tallest buildings in France
- List of tallest buildings and structures in the Paris region
