= Hermitage Group =

Real Estate Developer

The Hermitage Group is a French real estate developer. It is a member of the FPI (the French Federation of Developers). The group was founded by Emin Iskenderov, a Russia-born real estate developer and businessman based in Paris (France). The company is known for the mixed-use twin towers project Hermitage Plaza.

== Projects ==
- "Les Allées de l’Hermitage": In 2008, Hermitage opened its first residential programme with 300 units in Montévrain next to Euro Disneyland. Total floor area: 20,000 m² (215,000 sq.ft.), site area: 3,5 ha.
- "Le Jardin des Musees": A housing development opened in 2012 under the brand Immovi with 200 units, located 15km outside of Paris. Total floor area: 13,500 m² (145,000 sq.ft.), site area: 1ha.
- "Hermitage Plaza": a proposed mixed-use tower, 320 meters (1,050 feet) high with 85 and 86 stories located in Paris – La Défense. The project, designed by Sir Norman Foster, mixes residential units with offices, shops, hotel facilities, and cultural and leisure facilities. The project is supported by the French government on both regional and national level. Total floor area: 280 000m² (3,014,000 sq.ft.) / 165 000m² (1,776,000 sq.ft.) – apartments, 35,000 m² (377,000 sq.ft.) - Hotel, 40,000 m² (430,500 sq.ft.) - Offices, 40,000 m² (430,500 sq.ft.) – Retail and Art Center, Site area: 3ha / Building permit delivery: March 2012
