= Esso Tower =

Building in La Défense, Courbevoie, France

The Esso Tower was one of the first buildings built in La Défense in the 1960s. It was demolished in 1993 to be replaced by the Cœur Défense tower.

== A pioneer of La Défense ==
This building was a pioneer from many points of view: the first office building in France, it was built in the district of La Défense in 1963, when the business district was not yet established: only the CNIT was built earlier. The land had already been bought by Esso in 1957, even before the Public Establishment for Installation of La Défense (EPAD) existed.

Esso wanted its 1550 employees be able to work in a single comfortable and functional building. This one included one of the first self-service restaurants, an air-conditioned room for IBM computers, an employee lounge, and even a movie theater. The building went into service in April 1965.

In 1993, the Esso tower was also the first tower of La Défense to be demolished. Today the Cœur Défense tower rises in its place, completed in 2001.

== Characteristics ==
- Architects: Gréber, Lathrop Douglass
- 11 floors
- 30,000 m^{2}
- central concrete structure concentrating the elevators and the wiring network — the facades are metal curtain walls.
- built on the Commune of Courbevoie, in sector 4 of La Défense.
