= La Défense =

Business district in Île-de-France, France

Coordinates: 48°53′30″N 2°14′27″E

- Central business district
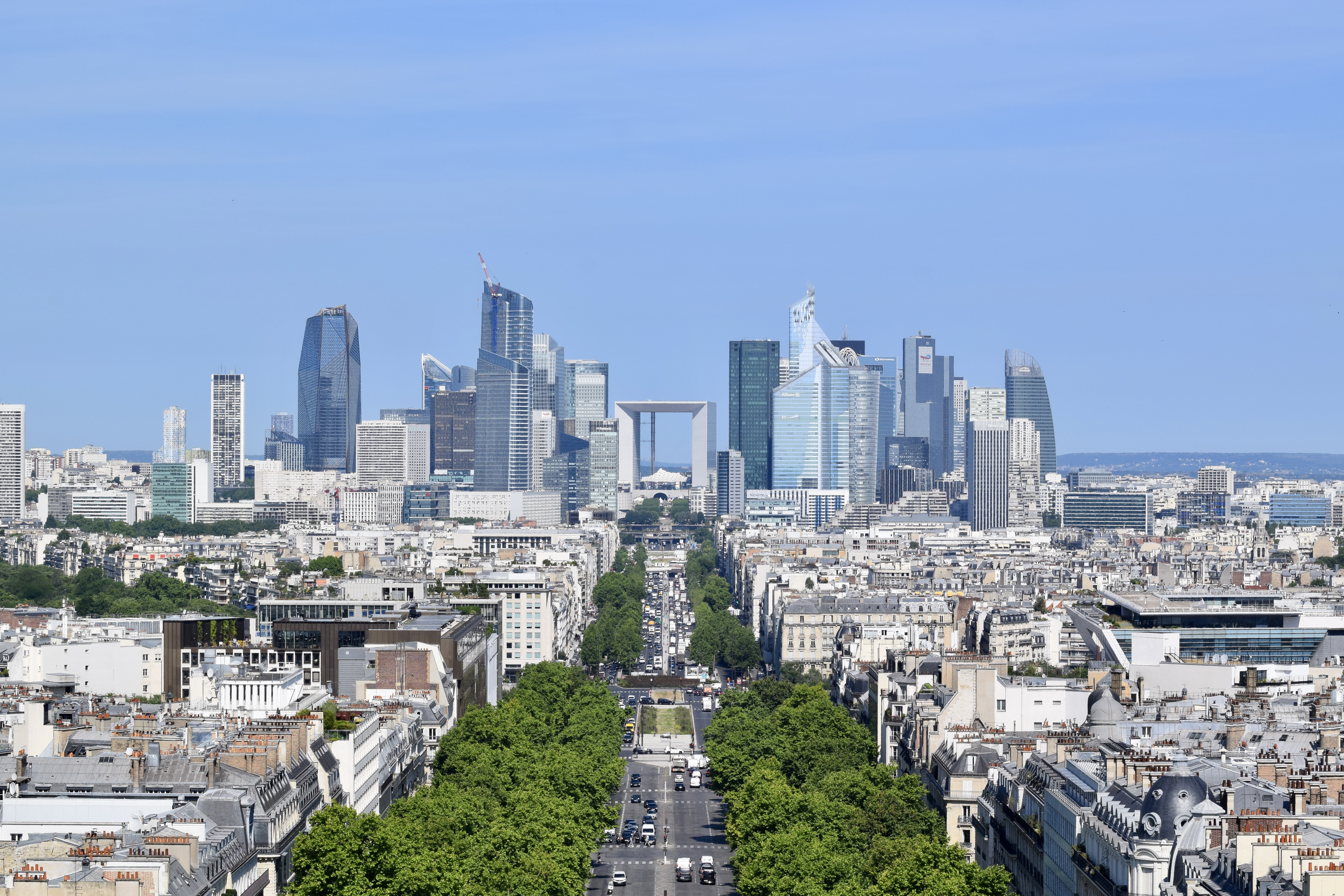
- La Défense as seen from the Arc de Triomphe

- Location within Paris Location within France
- Country: France
- Region: Île-de-France
- Department: Hauts-de-Seine
- Communes: List: Courbevoie; La Garenne-Colombes; Nanterre; Puteaux

Area
  - Total: 5.6 km^{2} (2.2 sq mi)

Population (2022)
  - Total: 50,000
- Time zone: UTC+1 (CET)
  - Summer (DST): UTC+2 (CEST)
- Postal code: 92
- Website: parisladefense.com

La Défense (French: [la defɑ̃s]) is a major business district situated in the Greater Paris metropolitan area in Île-de-France, at the western end of the French capital's historic axis. The district is home to the headquarters of numerous major French and foreign multinationals, as well as that of the Paris Bourse (Euronext) and European Banking Authority; which represents 3,500,000 square metres (38,000,000 sq ft) of office space.

Served by six high-capacity rail lines (RER A, RER E, Metro Line 1, Transilien lines L and U, and Tramway T2), numerous bus and coach routes, and soon by two new stations on Line 15 of the Grand Paris Express, and possibly by Line 18, which would connect it directly to Orly Airport and the Paris-Saclay research-intensive and business cluster, home to the HEC Paris and École Polytechnique campus, amongst other institutions, La Défense is one of the main transport hubs in the Paris region.

In 2025, La Défense was home to 2,800 companies, around 200,000 employees, 75,000 students and 50,000 residents, spread across 61 high-rise buildings. In 1981, the opening of Les Quatre Temps, still the most visited shopping centre in France (220 stores, 48 restaurants and a 24-screen movie theatre), established it as a major commercial hub in the Paris region. Plenitude Arena, the largest indoor arena in Europe, was inaugurated in 2017. La Défense is also visited by 8,000,000 tourists each year and houses an open-air museum.

The district is located at the westernmost extremity of the 10-kilometre-long (6.2 mi) Axe historique ("historical axis") of Paris, which starts at the Louvre in Central Paris and continues along the Champs-Élysées, well beyond the Arc de Triomphe along the Avenue de la Grande Armée before culminating at La Défense. The district is centred in an orbital motorway straddling the Hauts-de-Seine department communes of Courbevoie, La Garenne-Colombes, Nanterre and Puteaux.

== History ==
La Grande Arche de la Défense and the Yaacov Agam Fountain (1977). The bronze sculpture on the left, seen from the rear, is La Défense de Paris by Louis-Ernest Barrias, after which La Défense is named.

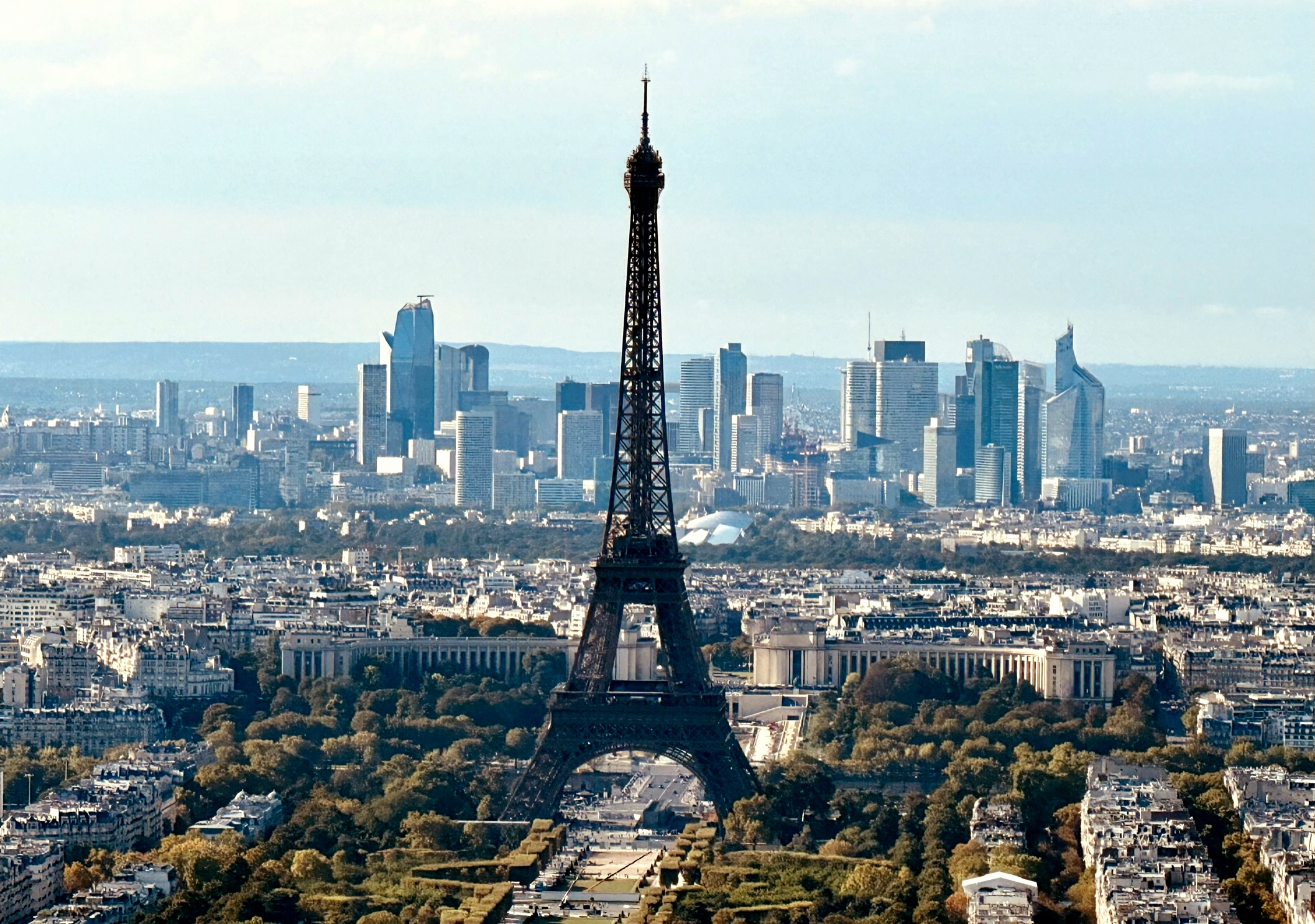
Paris, with the skyscrapers of La Défense in the background and the Eiffel Tower in the foreground taken in 2023

The Grande Arche is the central and defining building of La Défense. It is, with the Arc de Triomphe de l'Étoile and the Arc de Triomphe du Carrousel, the third arch on the Historical Axis of Paris.

La Défense takes its name from the statue La Défense de Paris by Louis-Ernest Barrias, which was erected in 1883 to commemorate the soldiers who defended Paris during the Franco-Prussian War.

In September 1958, the Public Establishment for Installation of La Défense (EPAD) buildings (of which the Esso Tower was the first) were constructed and began to slowly replace the city's factories, shanties, and even a few farms. The Centre of New Industries and Technologies (CNIT) was built and first used in 1958. These "first generation" skyscrapers were all very similar in appearance, limited to a height of 100 metres (330 ft). In 1966, the Nobel Tower was the first office skyscraper built in the area. In 1970, the RER line A railway was opened from La Défense to Étoile. In 1974, a contract for a Défense-Cergy high-speed hovercraft train was signed and soon abandoned.

In the early 1970s, in response to great demand, a second generation of buildings began to appear, but the economic crisis in 1973 nearly halted all construction in the area. A third generation of towers began to appear in the early 1980s. The biggest shopping centre in Europe (at the time), the Quatre Temps, was created in 1981. In 1982, the EPAD launched the Tête Défense competition to find a monument to complete the Axe historique, which eventually led to the construction of Grande Arche at the west end of the quarter. During the same period, hotels were constructed, the CNIT was restructured, and in 1992, Line 1 of the Paris Métro was extended to La Défense, which made the area readily accessible to more of the city.

On Bastille Day 1990, French electronic composer Jean-Michel Jarre staged an ambitious concert at the site, using the Grande Arche and three of the area's towers as projection screens, and building a pyramidal stage above the road. The free concert, titled Paris la Défense, attracted two million spectators, stretching all the way back to the Arc de Triomphe. This beat Jarre's own previous world record for the largest attendance for a musical concert. After Jean Michel Jarre, German DJ Sash! and the singer La Trec set the video clip for their song Stay at La Défense in 1997.

After a stagnation in new development in the mid-1990s, La Défense is once again expanding and is now the largest purpose-built business district in Europe.

Major corporations headquartered at La Défense include Neuf Cegetel, Société Générale, TotalEnergies, Aventis, Areva, and Arcelor. The tallest skyscraper, the Tour First belongs to AXA, constructed in 1974. It is 231 metres (758 ft) high, has 50 floors, and is the highest inhabited building in the Paris area. This title was previously held by the Tour Montparnasse, which was the tallest inhabited building until the Tour First was renovated between 2007 and 2011, bringing it to its current height from a previous 159 metres (522 ft); the tallest structure in Paris is the Eiffel Tower.

On 9 September 2008, La Défense celebrated its 50th anniversary with a huge fireworks display.

In December 2005, Bernard Bled, CEO and chairman of EPAD (La Defense Management and Development Office) announced an ambitious nine-year development plan called "La Defense 2006–2015". This important modernisation plan has to give a new dimension to the district and focuses on four main axes: regenerate outdated skyscrapers, allow new buildings, improve the balance between offices and residential housing, and make the transport of local employees from their homes to La Défense easier. There are three aims: building 150,000 square metres (1,600,000 ft^{2}) of offices within demolition/rebuilding projects, building 300,000 square metres (3,200,000 ft^{2}) of offices within new projects, and building 100,000 square metres (1,100,000 ft^{2}) of housing.

In July 2006, the government confirmed this plan, which has to be carried out around 2015. It is justified by the strong estate pressure, which plays in favour of building new skyscrapers near Paris. Those constructions have the advantage of being more economical than small buildings. But it will have to overcome some difficulties: the French economy faced a short-term slowdown; the government is trying to balance tertiary sector employment in the whole region again, because today La Défense concentrates a major part of those jobs; and traffic is already saturated in the district, while it would need huge investments to extend transport infrastructures.

It launched high-profile international competitions and/or construction approval of several key 300-to-320-metre (980 to 1,050 ft) tall sustainable development-style skyscrapers such as Tour Signal, Tour Phare, Hermitage Plaza, and Tour Generali. During said December 2005 Press Conference, EPAD released to the public an elaborate 3D animation film titled La Défense 2016.

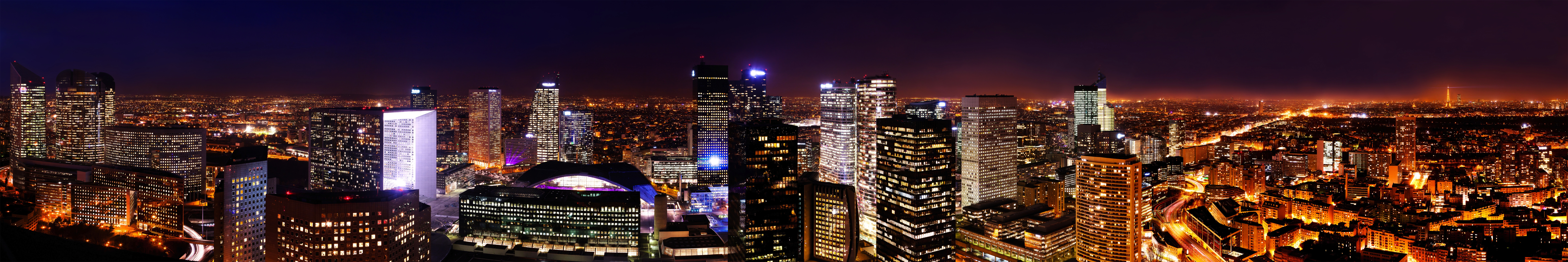
The district at night

== Education ==
Paris La Défense brings together the cluster of Leonardo da Vinci University Center, the IA Institut, a campus of EPITA and 4 business schools: EDC Paris Business School, ESSEC Business School, ICN Graduate Business School and IESEG School of Management. It is also home to the European School of Paris-La Défense, an international primary and secondary school that was accredited as a European School in 2020.

== Area specifications ==
- Divided into 4 major sectors
- 1,400 acres (5.7 km^{2})
- 3,500,000 square metres (38,000,000 sq ft) of offices
- 310,000 square metres (3,300,000 sq ft) of flagstone and sidewalk
- 245,000 square metres (2,640,000 sq ft) of shops (including the 140,000 square metres (1,500,000 sq ft) Westfield Les Quatre Temps Shopping Mall)
- 110,000 square metres (1,200,000 sq ft) of greenery
- 180,000 employees
- 70,000 students
- 50,000 residents
- 2,600 hotel rooms
- 1,500 businesses
- 500+ companies
- 150 restaurants
- 61 skyscrapers, 76 m (250 ft) average building height
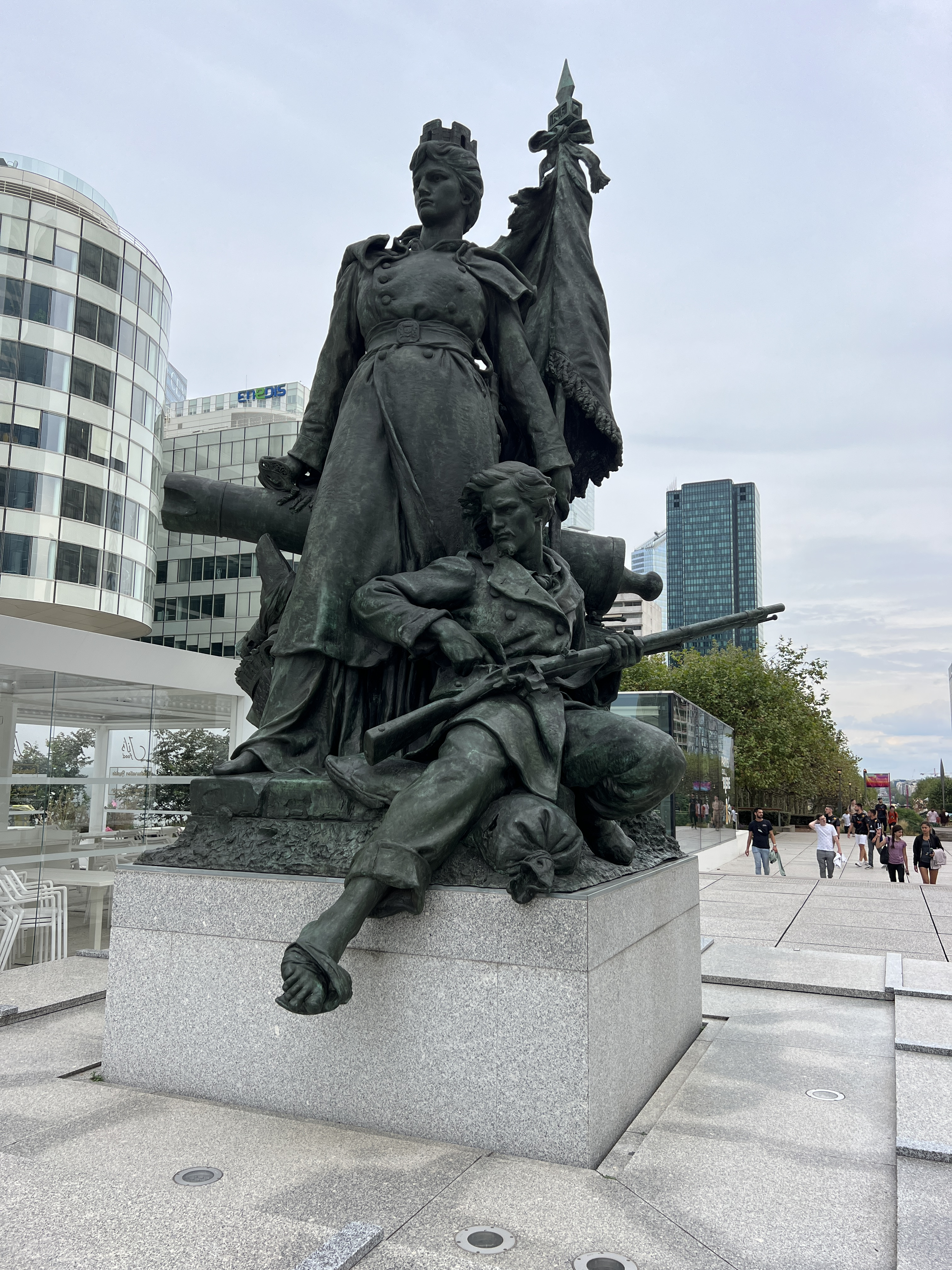
The name of the district comes from the statue of La Défense de Paris by Louis-Ernest Barrias which commemorates the Parisian resistance during the Franco-Prussian War.

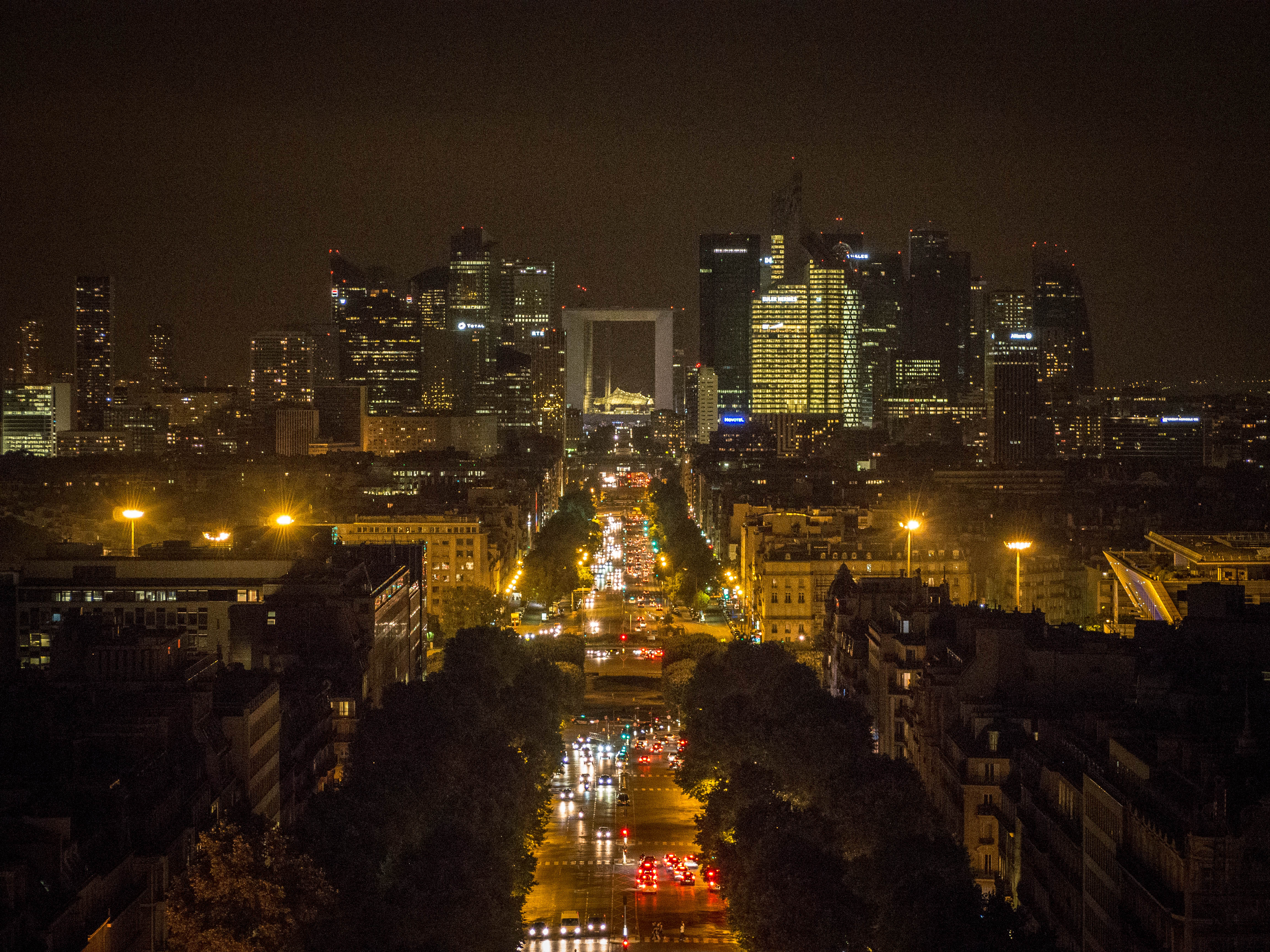
View from Arc de Triomphe at night.

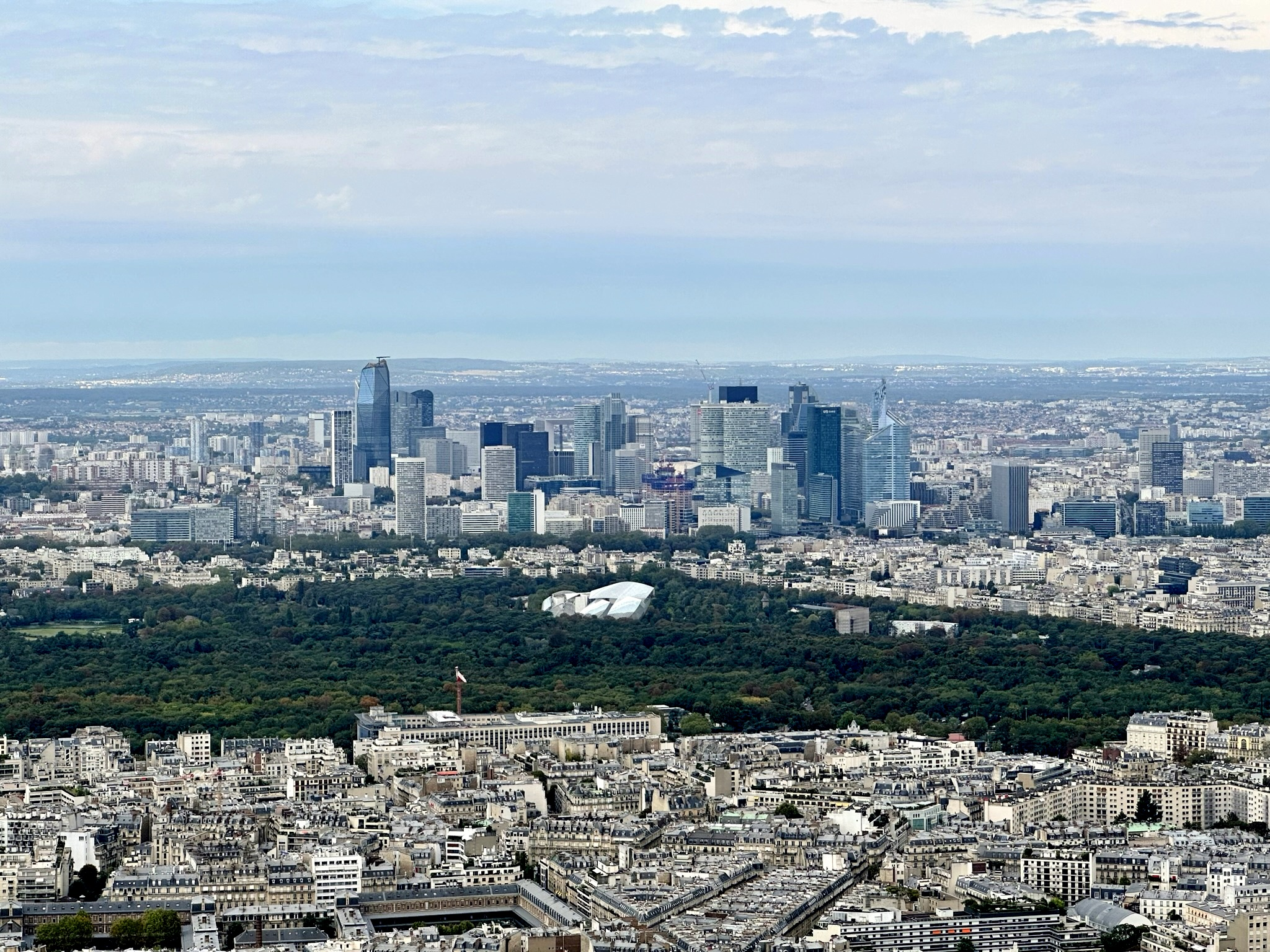
View from Eiffel Tower.

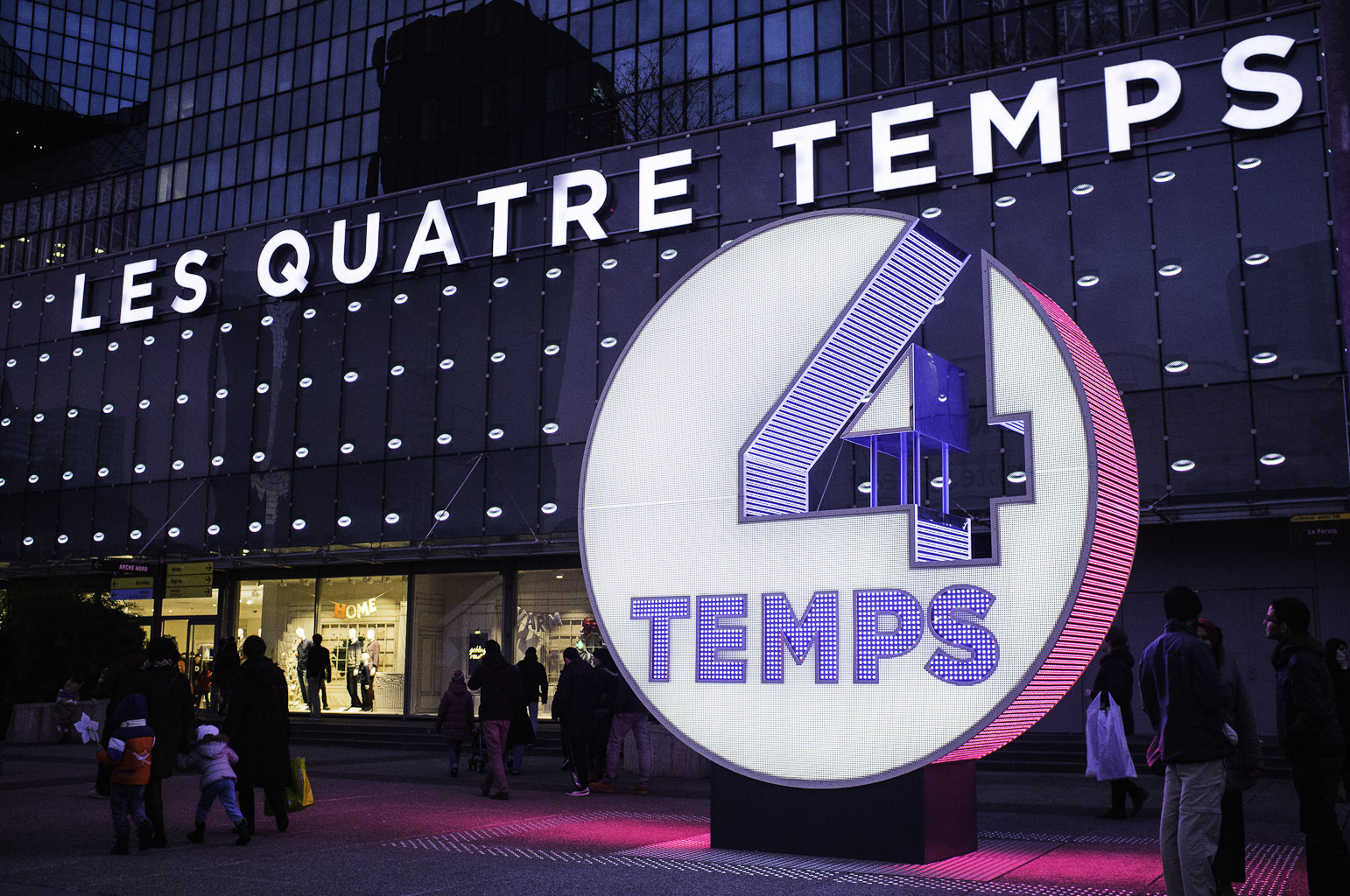
The Mall "Westfield Les Quatre Temps", one of Europe's largest shopping centers.

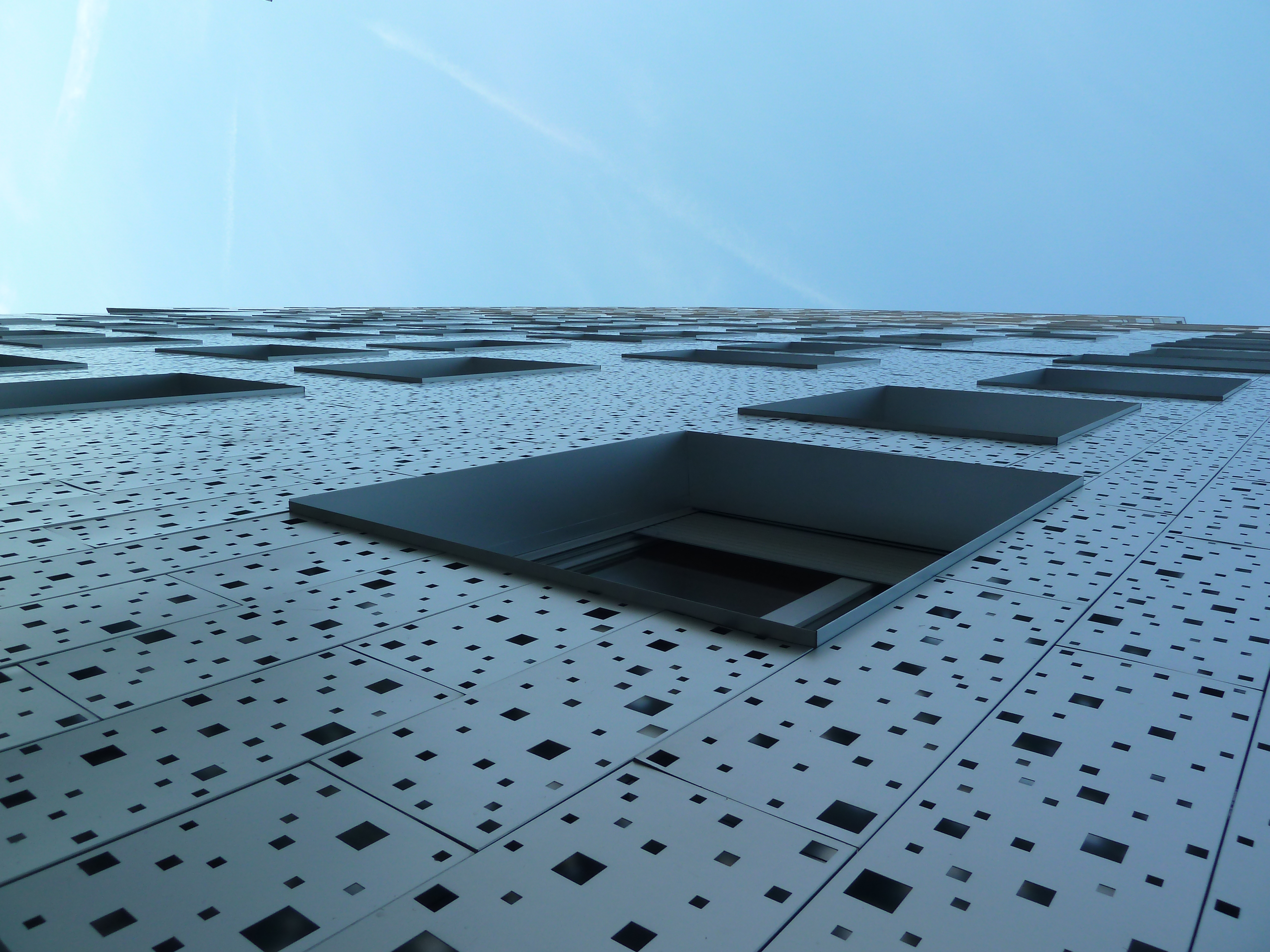
Skylight tower.

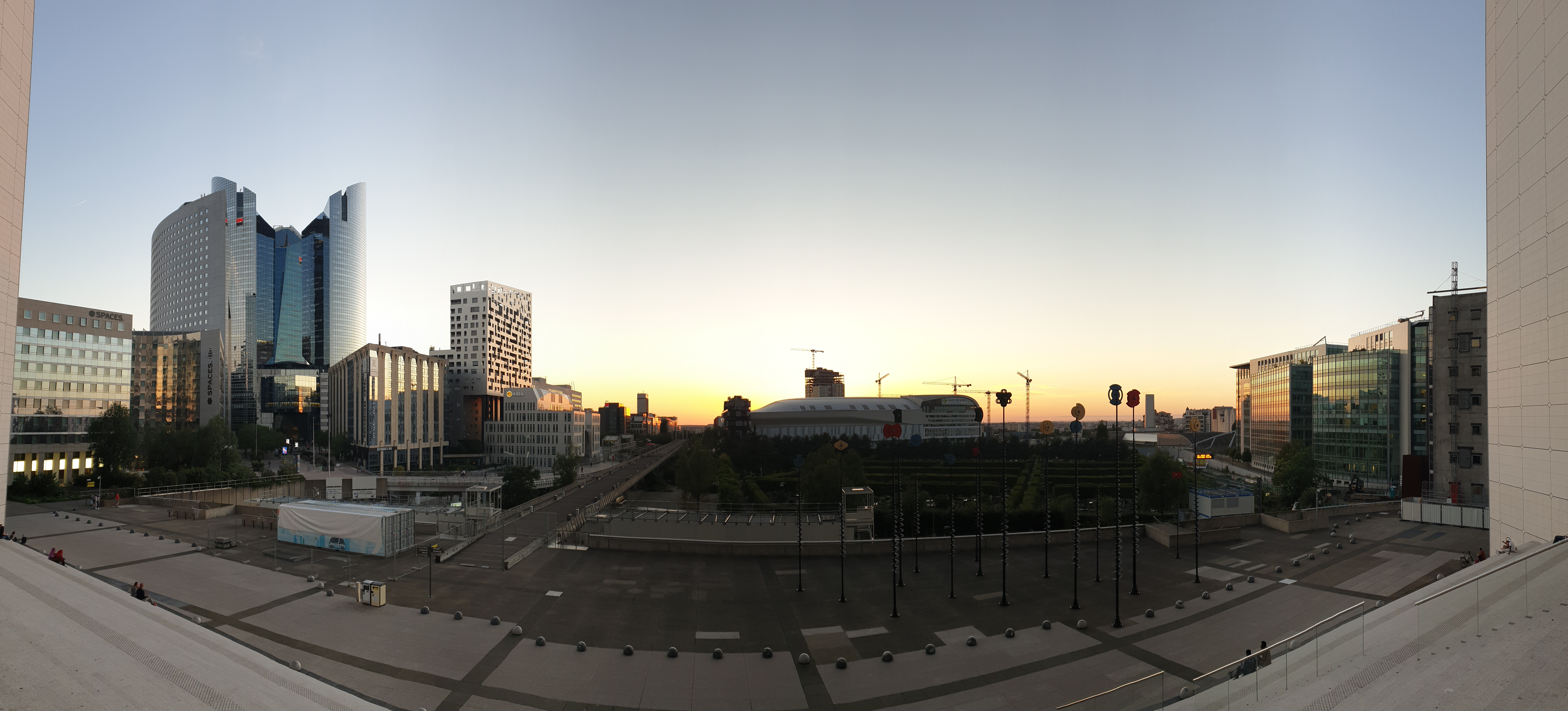
Western part of La Défense as seen from the Grande Arche.

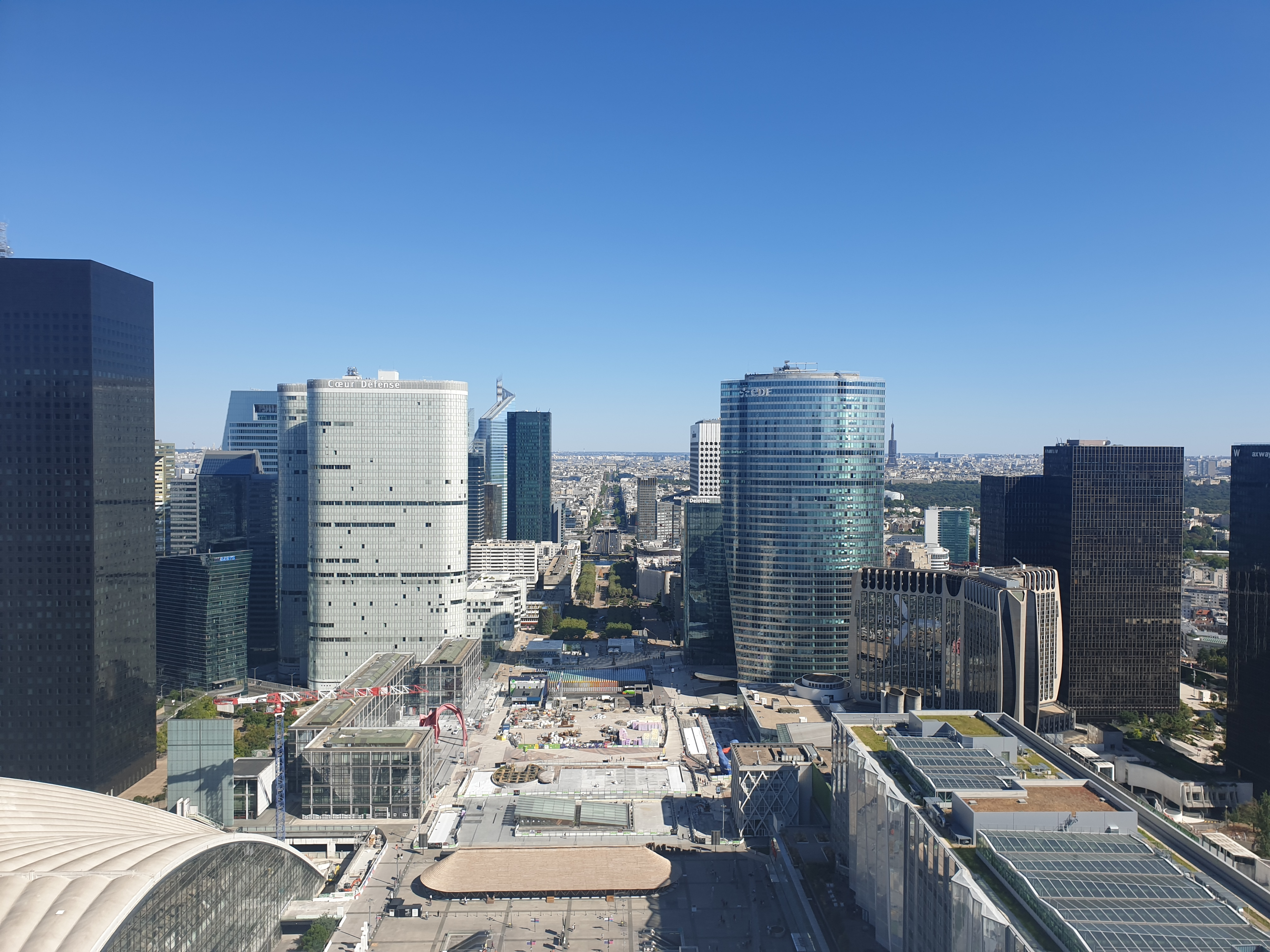
La Défense from the top of the Grande Arche.

== Open-air museum ==
Besides the representative architecture, the area also houses an open-air museum with 70 statues and pieces of modern art, including the following works:

- César, Thumb (1965)
- Joan Miró, Two fantastic characters (1976)
- Alexander Calder, Red Spider (1976)
- Yaacov Agam, Fountain (1977)
- Richard Serra, Slat (1982)
- Shelomo Selinger, The Dance (1983)
- Bernar Venet, Two Indeterminate Lines (1988)
- Takis, Bright Trees (1990)
- Igor Mitoraj, Tindaro (1997)
- Emily Young, Four Heads (2002)
- Patrick Blanc, Green wall (2006)
- Louis-Ernest Barrias, La Défense de Paris (1883)
- François Morellet, La Défonce (1990)
- Guillaume Bottazzi, Peinture de 216 m^{2} (2014)
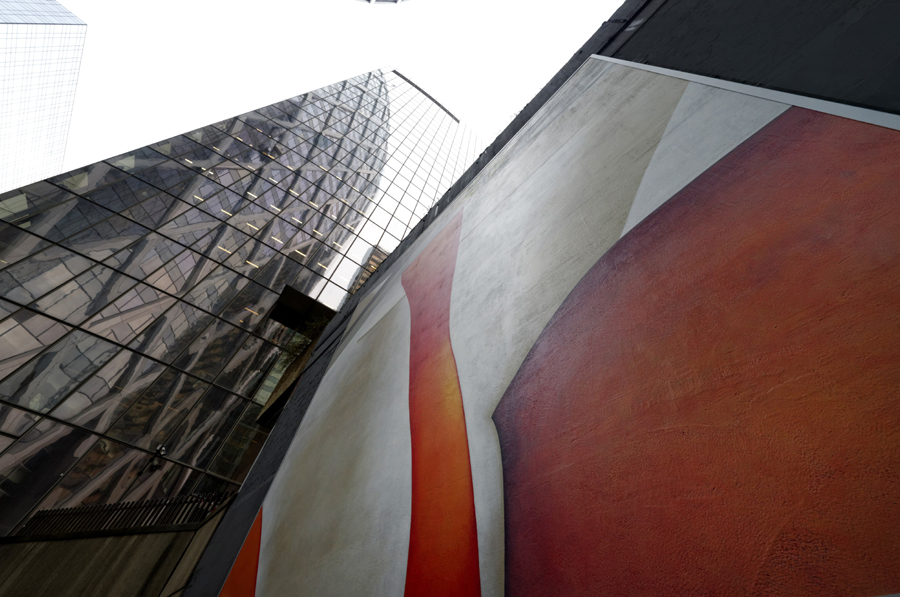
Guillaume Bottazzi, Untitled, c. 2014

== Highrise buildings ==
Tour First

Tour Total

Tour Areva

Tour Trinity

Tour Eria

Tour Pacific

=== Completed highrise buildings above 50 m (164 ft) (1967–2025) ===
Name	Built	Use	Height		Levels	Municipality
Name	Built	Use	metres	feet	Levels	Municipality
The Link	2025	office	242	794	52	Puteaux
Tour First (formerly tour AXA)	1974/2011	office	231	758	52	Courbevoie
Tour Hekla	2022	office	220	722	51	Puteaux
Tour Majunga	2014	office	194	636	47	Puteaux
Tour Total (Coupole)	1985	office	187	614	48	Courbevoie
Tour Engie (T1)	2008	office	185	607	37	Courbevoie
Tour Granite (Société Générale)	2008	office	184	600	37	Nanterre
Tour CB21 (formerly tour Gan)	1974	office	179	587	42	Courbevoie
Tour Areva	1974	office	178	584	44	Courbevoie
Tour Saint-Gobain	2020	office	178	584	39	Courbevoie
Tour D2	2014	office	171	561	37	Courbevoie
Tour Alicante (Société Générale)	1995	office	167	548	37	Nanterre
Tour Chassagne (Société Générale)	1995	office	167	548	37	Nanterre
Tour EDF	2001	office	165	541	41	Puteaux
Tour Carpe Diem	2013	office	162	531	38	Courbevoie
Cœur Défense	2001	office	161	528	40	Courbevoie
Tour Alto	2020	office	160	525	38	Courbevoie
Tour Adria (Technip)	2002	office	155	509	40	Courbevoie
Tour Égée (Ernst&Young)	1999	office	155	509	40	Courbevoie
Tour Ariane	1975	office	152	499	36	Puteaux
Tour Trinity	2020	office	151	495	32	Courbevoie
Tour Dexia (CBX)	2005	office	142	466	36	Courbevoie
Tour Europlaza	1995	office	135	443	31	Courbevoie
Tour Défense 2000	1974	residential	134	440	47	Puteaux
Tour Eqho (formerly tour Descartes)	1988	office	130	427	40	Courbevoie
Tour Les Poissons	1970	mixed	129.5	425	42	Courbevoie
Tour France	1973	residential	126	413	40	Puteaux
Tour Franklin	1972	office	120	394	33	Puteaux
Tour Sequoia (Bull, Cegetel, SFR)	1990	office	119	390	33	Puteaux
Tour Winterthur	1973	office	119	390	33	Puteaux
Tour CGI (CB16)	2003	office	117	384	32	Courbevoie
Tour Neptune	1972	office	113	371	28	Courbevoie
Préfecture des Hauts-de-Seine	1974	office	113	371	25	Nanterre
Grande Arche	1989	monument, office	110	361	37	Puteaux
Tour Manhattan	1975	office	110	361	32	Courbevoie
Tour Aurore	1970	office	110	361	29	Courbevoie
Tour Eve	1975	mixed	109	358	30	Puteaux
Tour Initiale	1967	office	109	358	30	Puteaux
L'archipel	2021	office	106	353	24	Nanterre
Tour Nuage 1, Tours Aillaud	1976	residential	105	344	39	Nanterre
Tour Nuage 2, Tours Aillaud	1976	residential	105	344	39	Nanterre
Tour Gambetta	1975	residential	104	341	37	Courbevoie
Tour Cèdre	1998	office	103	338	26	Courbevoie
Tour Opus 12	1973	office	100	328	27	Puteaux
Tour Athéna	1984	office	100	328	25	Puteaux
Tour Europe	1969	office	99	325	28	Courbevoie
Tour AIG	1967	office	99	325	27	Courbevoie
Tour Prisma (Tour Kvaerner)	1998	office	97	318	25	Courbevoie
Tour Atlantique	1970	office	95	312	27	Puteaux
Tour Pascal	1983	office	95	312	27	Puteaux
Tour Pacific	1992	office	90	295	25	Puteaux
Skylight	2017	residential	76	249	19	Puteaux
Rose de Cherbourg residence	2018	housing	75	246	20	Puteaux
Tour Eria	2021	mix	59.35	195	13	Puteaux

=== Upcoming highrise buildings (2025–2030) ===
Name	Use	Height		Levels	Municipality	Status	Estimated Year of Completion
Name	Use	metres	feet	Levels	Municipality	Status	Estimated Year of Completion
Tour Sister 1	office	229	718	55	Courbevoie	approved	2027
Tour des Jardins de l'Arche	office & hotel	210	656	54	Nanterre	approved	2027
Tour C/ (Odyssey)	office	187	613	42	Courbevoie	approved	2026
Tour O/ (Odyssey)	mix	174	570	33	Courbevoie	approved	2026
Tours Sister 2	office	131	396	26	Courbevoie	approved	2027
Tour D/ (Odyssey)	mix	101	331	?	Courbevoie	approved	2026

=== Canceled projects ===
1. Tour Sans Fins (1989): 425 m (1,394 ft)
2. Hermitage Plaza (2022): 323 m (1,060 ft)
3. Tour Generali (2011): 319 m (1,047 ft)
4. Tour Signal (2009): 301 m (988 ft)
5. Tour Phare (2018): 296 m (971 ft)

== See also ==
- Plenitude Arena
- List of tourist attractions in Paris

Other business districts in Europe

- City of London
- Bankenviertel
- Moscow International Business Center
- Śródmieście, Warsaw

Building comparisons

- List of tallest buildings in Paris
- List of tallest buildings in France
- List of tallest buildings in Europe
