= Les Quatre Temps =

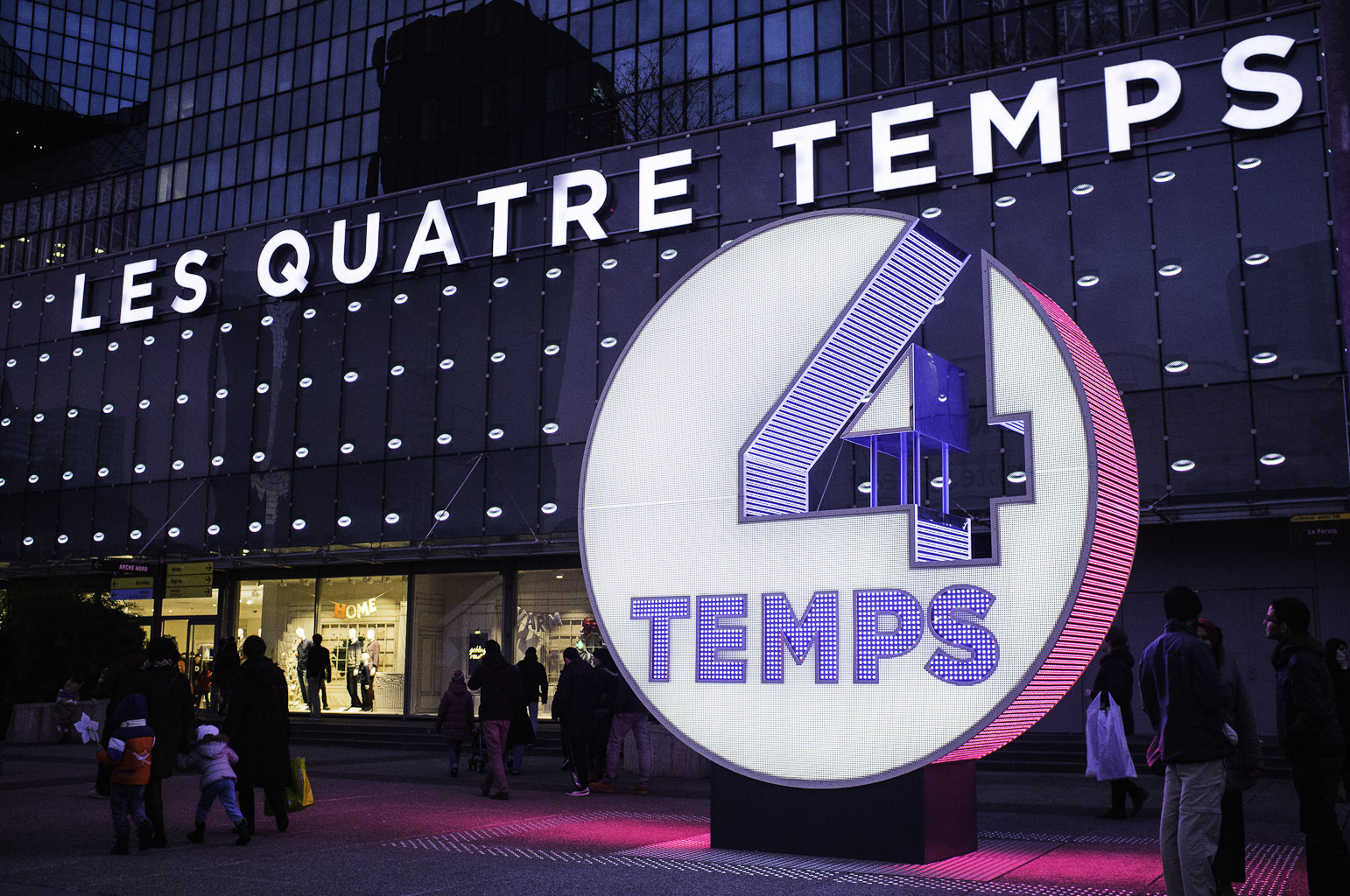
- Location: La Défense, France
- Coordinates: 48°53′21.603″N 02°14′17.523″E
- Address: 15 Parvis de la Défense
- Opened: 3 March 1981
- Owner: Unibail-Rodamco-Westfield
- Num. of stores: 230
- Floor area: 141,200 square metres (1,520,000 ft^{2})
- Parking: 6 500
- Public transit: La Défense station:
- Website: https://fr.westfield.com/les4temps/

Westfield Les 4 Temps is the main shopping centre in the business district of La Défense, in the western suburbs of Paris, on the territory of the commune of Puteaux in the Hauts-de-Seine. It is one of the largest shopping centres in Europe.

In 2019, Les Quatre Temps was the most visited shopping centre in France with 42 million visitors.

On 12 September 2019, Les 4 Temps became Westfield Les 4 Temps.

Today it houses nearly 200 stores, including the largest Zara in Europe, an Auchan supermarket, a UGC cinema and around fifty restaurants.

== See also ==
- La Défense
- Westfield Group
