= Tour Égée =

Office skyscraper located in La Défense

Tour Egée
- Tour Egée
- Interactive map of the Tour Egée area

General information
- Type: Office
- Location: La Défense (Courbevoie)
- Coordinates: 48°53′47.5″N 2°14′18.5″E
- Completed: 1999

Height
- Antenna spire: 155 m (509 ft)
- Roof: 155 m (509 ft)

Technical details
- Floor count: 40
- Floor area: 53,000 m^{2} (570,000 sq ft)

Design and construction
- Architect: Conceptua

Tour Égée (also known as tour Ernst&Young) is an office skyscraper located in La Défense, the high-rise business district situated west of Paris, France.

Tour Égée was built in 1999 by Michel Andrault and Nicolas Ayoub, architects from Conceptua. A twin of Tour Égée, Tour Adria, was built nearby three years later in 2002. The only difference between both towers consists in their cladding: the one from Adria is darker, while the one from Égée is lighter with a glass cladding giving an interesting feeling of vertical and horizontal stripes crossing at the level of each window. Tour Égée is 155 m (509 ft) tall and has a triangular floorplan.

== See also ==
- Skyscraper
- La Défense
- List of tallest structures in Paris
