= Valode & Pistre =

French architecture firm

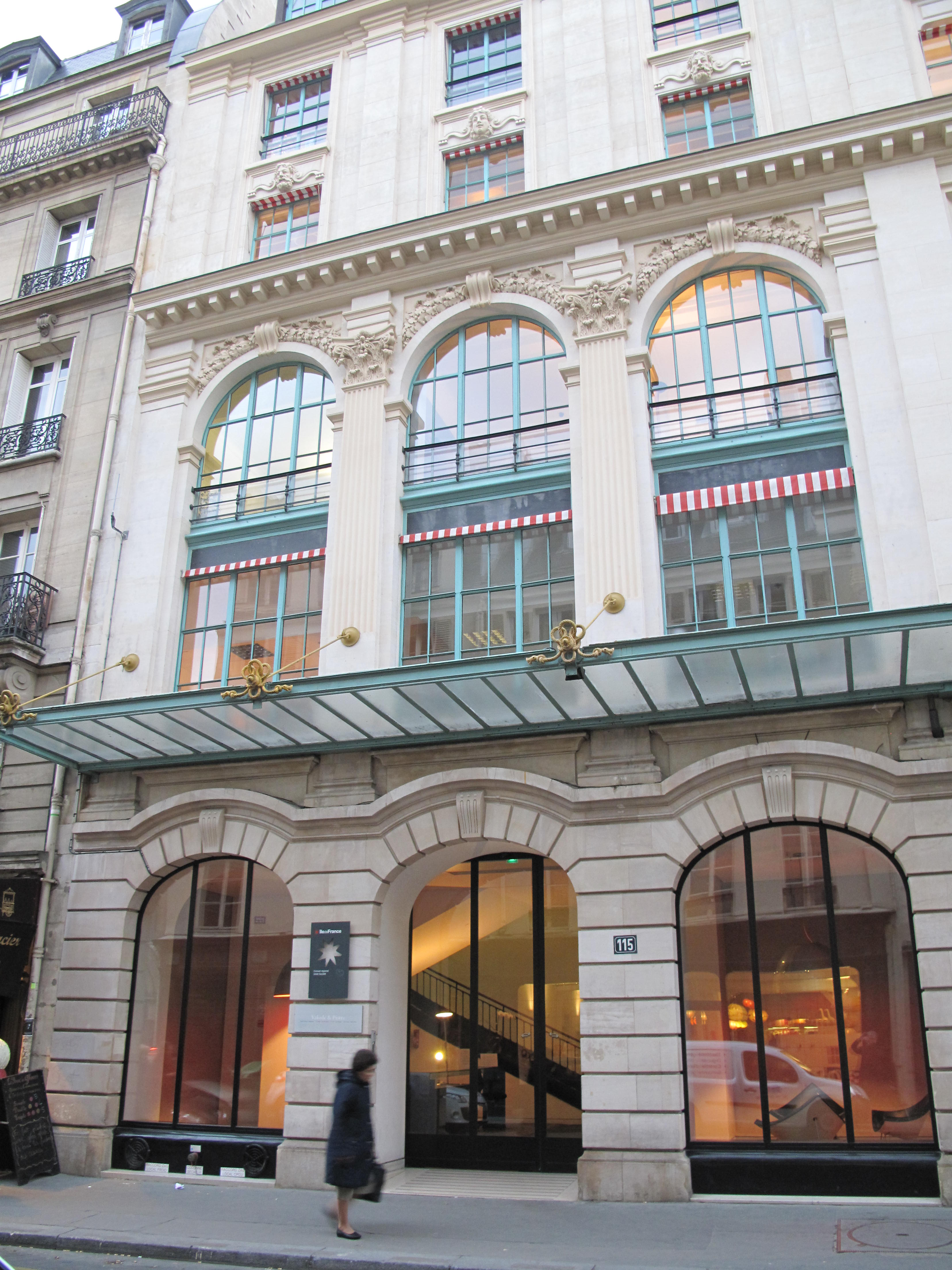
- 115 rue du Bac, company headquarters.
- Company type: Private
- Industry: Architecture
- Founded: 1980
- Founder: Denis Valode; Jean Pistre
- Headquarters: 115 rue du Bac, Paris, France
- Area served: Worldwide
- Revenue: 36 million euros (2015)
- Website: v-p.com

Valode & Pistre is a French architecture firm based in the 7th arrondissement of Paris, with branches in Moscow and Beijing.

== History ==
The firm was founded in 1980 by Denis Valode and Jean Pistre who met at the Beaux-Arts de Paris where the former was a student and the latter a teacher. The firm's first major project was the CAPC musée d'art contemporain de Bordeaux (1983).

By 2021, the firm had worked on more than two hundred projects in thirty-five countries.

== Activities ==
Valode & Pistre works on projects both in France and across the globe in Europe, Russia, the Middle East, Asia, North and Sub-Saharan Africa, and Central America.

Valode & Pistre’s projects are of very diverse scales, from developing new cities to designing furniture.

== Projects ==
- T1 Tower
- Tour Generali
- Air France head office
- Air France Cité PN
- Bouygues head office
- Centre commercial Beaugrenelle
- Paris Expo Porte de Versailles
- Shenzhen World Exhibition Center, world largest convention center
- Tour Saint-Gobain
- Le Portier (Monaco): global planning, four buildings, ten houses

== Awards ==
- 1992: Prix de l'Équerre d’argent for the L’Oréal factory in Aulnay-sous-Bois, France
