= Tour Adria =

- Interactive map of the Tour Adria area

General information
- Type: Office
- Location: La Défense (Courbevoie)
- Coordinates: 48°53′42″N 2°14′12″E
- Construction started: 1999
- Completed: 2002

Height
- Antenna spire: 155 m (509 ft)
- Roof: 155 m (509 ft)

Technical details
- Floor count: 40
- Floor area: 53,000 m^{2} (570,000 sq ft)

Design and construction
- Architect: Conceptua

Website
- parisladefense.com/en/discover/towers/adria

Tour Adria (also known as tour Technip) is an office skyscraper located in La Défense, the high-rise business district situated west of Paris, France. It has a triangular floorplan.

Built in 2002 by Michel Andrault and Nicolas Ayoub, architects from Conceptua, it is a twin of the nearby Tour Égée, which was built three years before in 1999. The only difference between both towers consists in their cladding: the one from Égée is white when the one from Adria is darker with windows looking like vertical glass stripes. Tour Adria is 155 m (509 ft) tall.

Since its construction it has been occupied by the French engineering company Technip as its group headquarters.

== See also ==
- Skyscraper
- La Défense
- List of tallest structures in Paris
