= Phare Tower =

- Tour Phare
- Interactive map of the Phare Tower area

General information
- Status: Cancelled
- Type: Office, monument and retail
- Location: La Défense (Courbevoie, France)

Height
- Antenna spire: 296 m (971 ft)

Technical details
- Floor count: 71
- Floor area: 130,000 m^{2} (1,400,000 sq ft)

Design and construction
- Architect: Morphosis (Thom Mayne)
- Developer: Unibail
- Structural engineer: IBE Consulting Engineers (MEP)

The Phare Tower (Tour Phare), in English, "Beacon Tower", was a planned approx. 300-metre (984 ft) tall skyscraper with 71 floors designed as a green building to be built in Courbevoie (Hauts-de-Seine), France, in the La Défense district of suburban Paris. The building was being designed by Los Angeles-based Morphosis, headed by architect Thom Mayne, and would have been completed in 2018. Had it been built, it would have been the tallest skyscraper in Paris and one of the tallest in the European Union. Tour Phare was cancelled and could be replaced by Sister Towers.

== Name ==
While the French word phare means lighthouse (from Pharos) when employed alone, it also applies to any source of light used as a beacon. In this context, phare is used to describe the tower as something that will bring attention. Tour Phare was meant to bring an architectural beacon to the periphery of Paris and more specifically La Défense.

== See also ==
- List of tallest buildings and structures in the Paris region

== Sources ==
- Design Build Network: Le Phare
- Treehugger: Thom Mayne to Build Big Eco-Tower in Paris
- Marvelous Architectures: Paris plans rival to Eiffel Tower
- Stamberg, Susan (April 28, 2007). "A New Tower to Soar Over Paris". NPR.
