= Charles Émile Seurre =

French sculptor (1798–1858)

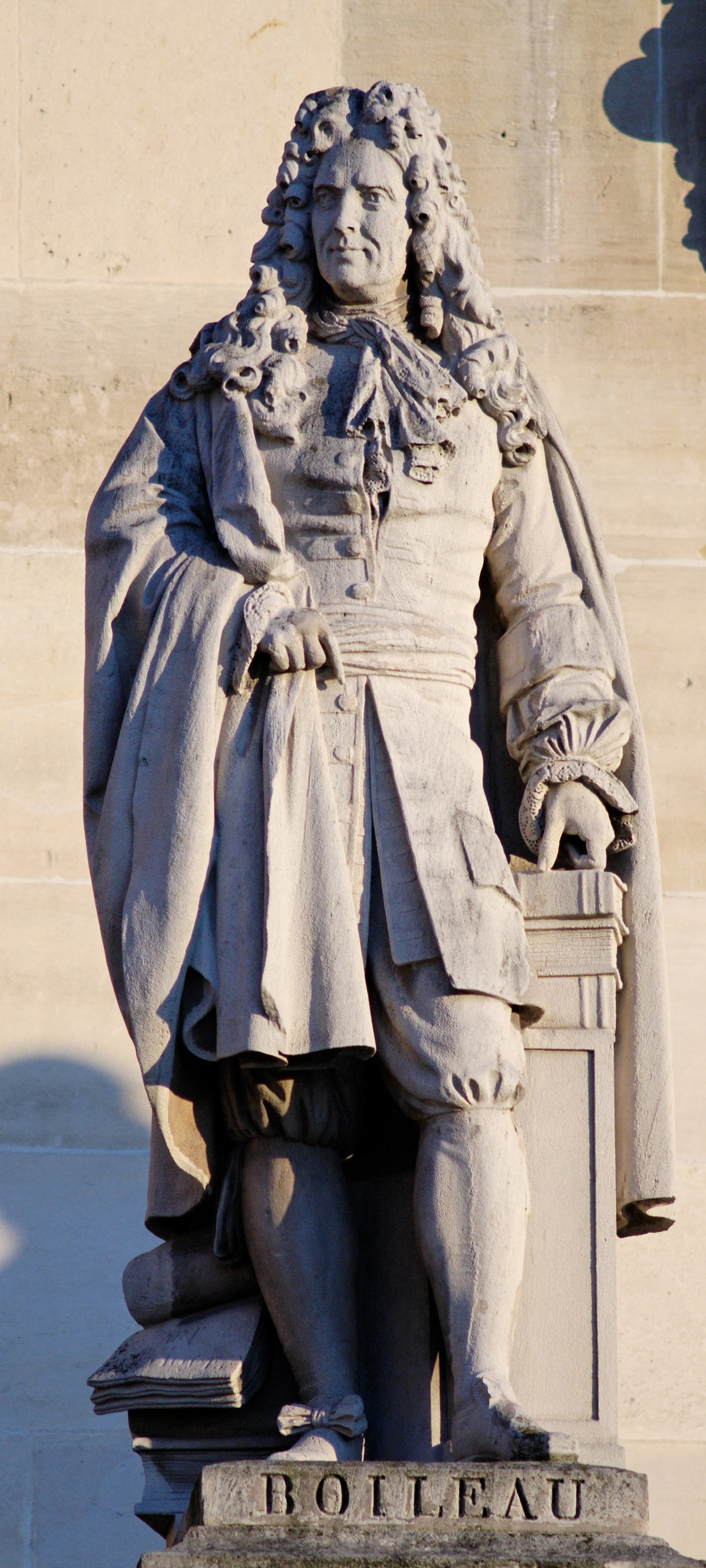
Nicolas Boileau by Seurre the Younger, cour Napoléon of the palais du Louvre

Charles Marie Émile Seurre (22 February 1798 – 11 January 1858) was a French sculptor.

== Life ==
Seurre was born and died in Paris. A student of the sculptor Pierre Cartellier, in 1824 Émile Seurre won the Prix de Rome for sculpture with a relief on the subject Joseph's tunic brought back to Jacob. Like his elder brother Bernard Seurre, he took part in spreading the Napoleonic legend and is best known for his series of statues of 'great men'.

== Works ==
- Napoléon I (1833), standing statue, bronze, Paris, Hôtel des Invalides, cour d'honneur
- Napoléon I, standing statue (smaller version), bronze, Versailles, châteaux de Versailles et de Trianon
- The Navy, allegorical figure, Paris, Arc de Triomphe de l'Étoile, under the arc de triomphe, north spandrel
- Talent, statue, Paris, Père Lachaise Cemetery, tomb of Pierre Cartellier, left side
- A stela with three veiled figures, bas-relief, Paris, cimetière du Père-Lachaise, tomb of Pierre Cartellier, to the right of the tomb
- Portrait of Hugues Quiéret, admiral of France (died 1340) (1840), bust, plaster, Versailles, châteaux de Versailles et de Trianon
- Saint Louis, standing statue, Versailles, châteaux de Versailles et de Trianon
- Gaston de Foix, duc de Nemours (1489 - 1512) (1842), standing statue, marble, Versailles, châteaux de Versailles et de Trianon
- Charles VII, standing statue, marble, Versailles, châteaux de Versailles et de Trianon
- Statue of the young Romain at the musée Crozatier du Puy-en-Velay.

== Sources ==
- (in French) Simone Hoog, (preface by Jean-Pierre Babelon, with Roland Brossard), Musée national de Versailles. Les sculptures. I- Le musée, Réunion des musées nationaux, Paris, 1993
- (in French) Pierre Kjellberg, Le Nouveau guide des statues de Paris, La Bibliothèque des Arts, Paris, 1988
- (in French) Emmanuel Schwartz, Les Sculptures de l'École des Beaux-Arts de Paris. Histoire, doctrines, catalogue, École nationale supérieure des Beaux-Arts, Paris, 2003
