= Tour Initiale =

- The Tour Initiale
- Interactive map of the Tour Initiale area

General information
- Type: Office
- Location: La Défense (Puteaux)
- Coordinates: 48°53′13″N 2°15′05″E
- Completed: 1966

Height
- Antenna spire: 109 m (358 ft)
- Roof: 109 m (358 ft)

Technical details
- Floor count: 30
- Floor area: 34,300 m^{2} (369,000 sq ft)

Design and construction
- Architects: Jean de Mailly, Jacques Depussé

Tour Initiale (previously known as tour Nobel) is an office building located in La Défense business district just west of Paris, France. The 105 m (344 ft) Tour Initiale was the first office tower built in the La Défense district with its construction being completed in 1966. In 1988, the tower was removed of asbestos, given an internal renovation, and rechristened as the Tour Initiale.

The Tour Initiale was designed by architects Jean de Mailly and Jacques Depussé and engineer Jean Prouvé who designed the building's glass facade. The tower uses curved glass on the building's corners, which, at the time of construction, was generally unknown in France and the glass had to be imported from the United States.

== See also ==
Tour Initiale in 2009

- Skyscraper
- La Défense
- List of tallest structures in Paris
