= Centre of New Industries and Technologies =

Shopping centre, convention centre and hotel in Île-de-France, France

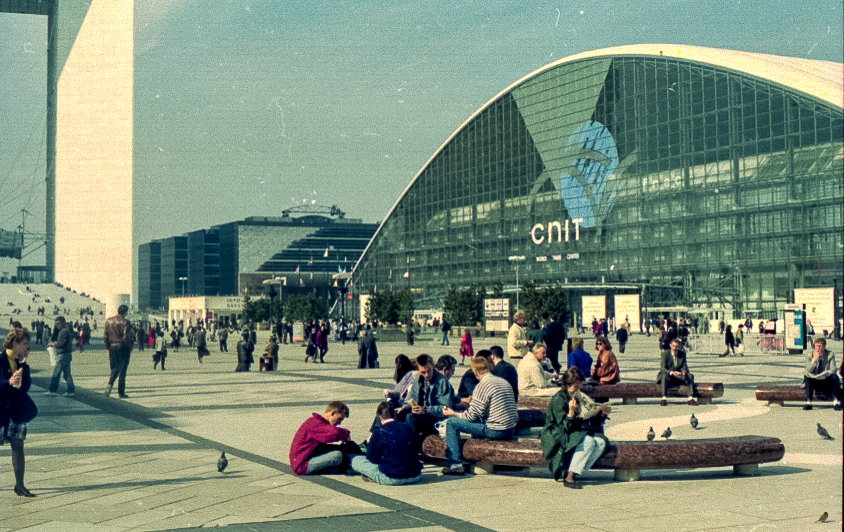
- The CNIT Building

General information
- Status: Completed
- Type: Shopping centre, convention center, hotel
- Location: 2 Place de la Défense; La Défense, Puteaux, France
- Coordinates: 48.8927415°N 2.2391581°E
- Construction started: 1956
- Completed: 1958
- Owner: Unibail-Rodamco-Westfield
- Operator: Viparis

Height
- Roof: 46.3 m (152 ft)

Design and construction
- Architects: Robert Camelot; Jean de Mailly; Bernard Zehrfuss; Nicolas Esquillan; Jean Prouvé

The CNIT

The Centre of New Industries and Technologies (French: Centre des nouvelles industries et technologies, pronounced [sɑ̃tʁ de nuvɛlz‿ɛ̃dystʁi e tɛknɔlɔʒi], abbreviated CNIT), located in Puteaux, France, was the first building developed in La Défense, west of Paris, France. It functions as a convention centre, though it also houses shops and offices such as Fnac (a media and electronics retailer found throughout France), ESSEC Business School campus for executive education, as well as a Hilton hotel.

Its characteristic shape is due to the triangular plot it occupies, replacing the old Zodiac factories, on the territory of Puteaux. Opened in 1958, the CNIT underwent two renovations, in 1989 and 2009. It is managed by the company Viparis.

== History ==
The initial construction of the building took place between 1957 and 1958, with the first concrete poured on May 8. Its architects were Robert Camelot, Jean de Mailly, Bernard Zehrfuss accompanied by the engineer Jean Prouvé for the exterior. The structural engineer for the concrete shell was Nicolas Esquillan.

At the time of its construction, the La Défense business district did not exist and the site for the building was at the roundabout or "rond point" of La Défense where the old Zodiac Aerospace factory was situated. The site was named for a statue called "La Défense de Paris" by the sculptor Louis-Ernest Barrias which was situated on a natural hill between the towns of Puteaux and Courbevoie. This statue, originally erected in 1883, has now been moved to the west of the La Défense plaza.

Originally conceived as an exhibition center for the French machine tools industry, the building was inaugurated by General, and soon to be president, Charles de Gaulle on 12 September 1958.

=== Construction of the La Défense plaza ===
In 1978 a great plaza was constructed next to the site of the CNIT building. The newly raised pedestrian precinct covered the railway station, all of the tracks and a good third of the height of the CNIT building. The entrance ways, characterized by rectangular blocks, were removed.

The La Défense plaza now covers a large area to the south of this building and is three stories above ground level.

=== 1989 renovation ===
In 1989, the space covered by the CNIT building was completely overhauled. Only the vault was retained from the original construction. It encompassed 200,000 square metres (2,200,000 square feet) of floor area. The internal structure, which then contained new offices and a luxury hotel (currently the Paris La Defense Hilton), was radically changed.

=== 2009 refurbishment ===
A major refurbishment of the CNIT was finished in summer 2009, increasing the public space within the building by the re-opening of the lower floor which now contains new shops and restaurants. During this work, some of the more esthetic features of the 1988 redesign, including the striking triangular door handles that copied the shape of the building were lost to more modern but otherwise unremarkable fittings.

=== Architecture & Engineering ===
This building is notable for being the largest unsupported concrete span enclosed space in the world. Its triangular structure is supported on three points that are 218 m (715 ft) apart. The centre of the roof is more than 46 m (151 ft) above the ground. Situated on the northern side of the La Defense plaza, this is one of the most eye catching buildings in modern architecture, being constructed of reinforced concrete in an innovative double shelled design with internal ribs.

Internally, the impressive vaulted roof is entirely unencumbered by columns or girders and the buildings within the space provide no structural support whatsoever, seeming rather to hang from the span itself.
