= Axe historique =

Line of monuments, buildings, and thoroughfares in Paris, France

Coordinates: 48°52′14″N 2°18′18″E

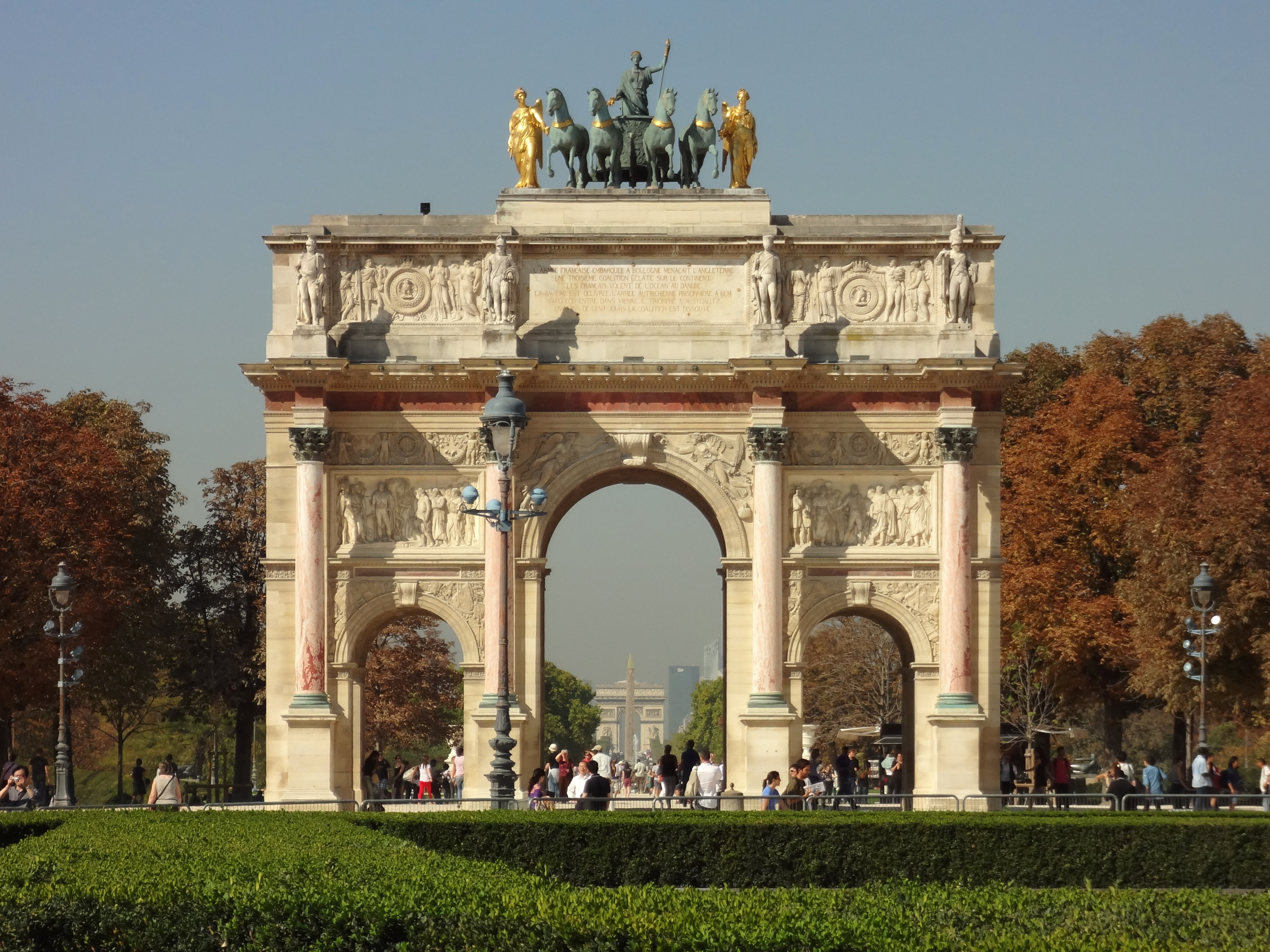
The Arc de Triomphe du Carrousel, the obelisk of the Place de la Concorde, the Arc de Triomphe, and the Grande Arche of La Défense, on the same sightline.

The Axe historique (French: [aks istɔʁik]; "Historical axis") is a straightly aligned series of thoroughfare streets, squares, monuments and buildings that extend from the centre of Paris, France, to the west-northwest of the city. It is also known as the Voie Triomphale (French: [vwa tʁijɔ̃fal]; "triumphal way").

== History ==
The Axe historique began with the creation of the Champs-Élysées, designed in the 17th century to create a vista to the west, extending the central axis of the gardens to the royal Tuileries Palace. Today the Tuileries Garden remain, preserving their wide central pathway, though the palace was burned down during the Paris Commune, 1871.

Between the Tuileries Garden and the Champs-Élysées extension a jumble of buildings remained on the site of the Place de la Concorde until early in the reign of Louis XV, for whom the square was at first named. Then the garden axis could open through a grand gateway into the new royal square.

To the east, the Tuileries Palace faced an open square, the Place du Carrousel. There, by order of Napoleon, the Arc de Triomphe du Carrousel was centered on the palace (and so on the same axial line that was developing beyond the palace). Long-standing plans to link the Louvre Palace, as the disused palace was called, with the Tuileries, by sweeping away the intervening buildings, finally came to fruition in the early 19th century. Consequently, the older axis extending from the courtyard of the Louvre is slightly skewed to the rest of what has become the Axe historique, but the Arc du Carrousel, at the fulcrum between the two, serves to disguise the discontinuity.

To the west, the completion of the Arc de Triomphe in 1836 on the Place de l'Étoile at the western end of the Champs-Élysées formed the far point of this line of perspective, which now starts at the equestrian statue of Louis XIV placed by I.M. Pei adjacent to his Louvre Pyramid in the Cour Napoléon of the Louvre.

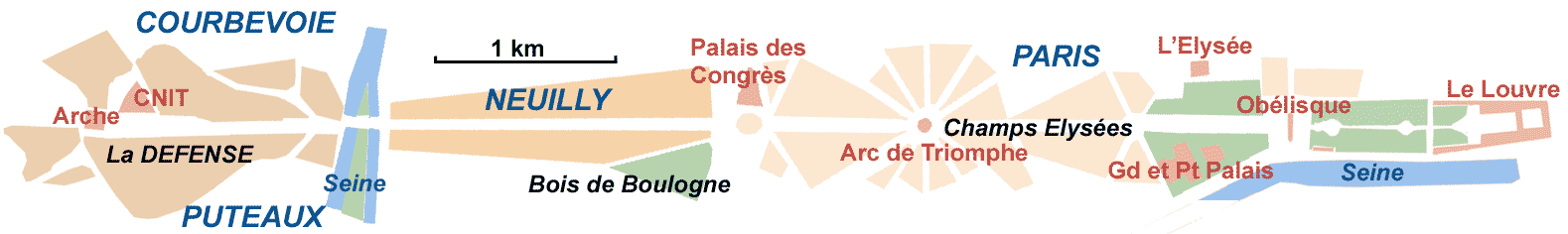

The axis was again extended westwards along the Avenue de la Grande Armée, past the city boundary of Paris to La Défense. This was originally a large junction, named for a statue commemorating the defence of Paris in the Franco-Prussian War.

In the 1950s, the area around La Défense was marked out to become a new business district, and high-rise office buildings were built along the avenue. The axis found itself extended yet again, with ambitious projects for the western extremity of the modern plaza.

It was not until the 1980s, under president François Mitterrand, that a project was initiated, with a modern 20th century version of the Arc de Triomphe. This is the work of Danish architect Johan Otto von Spreckelsen, La Grande Arche de la Fraternité (also known as simply La Grande Arche or L'Arche de la Défense), a monument to humanity and humanitarian ideals rather than militaristic victories. It was inaugurated in 1989.

The network of railway lines and road tunnels beneath the elevated plaza of La Défense prevented the pillars supporting the arch from being exactly in line with the axis: it is slightly out of line, bending the axis should it be extended further to the west. From the roof of the Grande Arche, a second axis can be seen: the Tour Montparnasse stands exactly behind the Eiffel Tower. The Seine-Arche project is extending the historical axis to the west through the city of Nanterre, but with a slight curve.

== Solar alignment ==
As a natural consequence of the nature of the line, the sun sets behind the Grande Arche twice per year, in a phenomenon dubbed "Paris henge".

== Gallery ==
The Axe historique looking west from the Place de la Concorde.

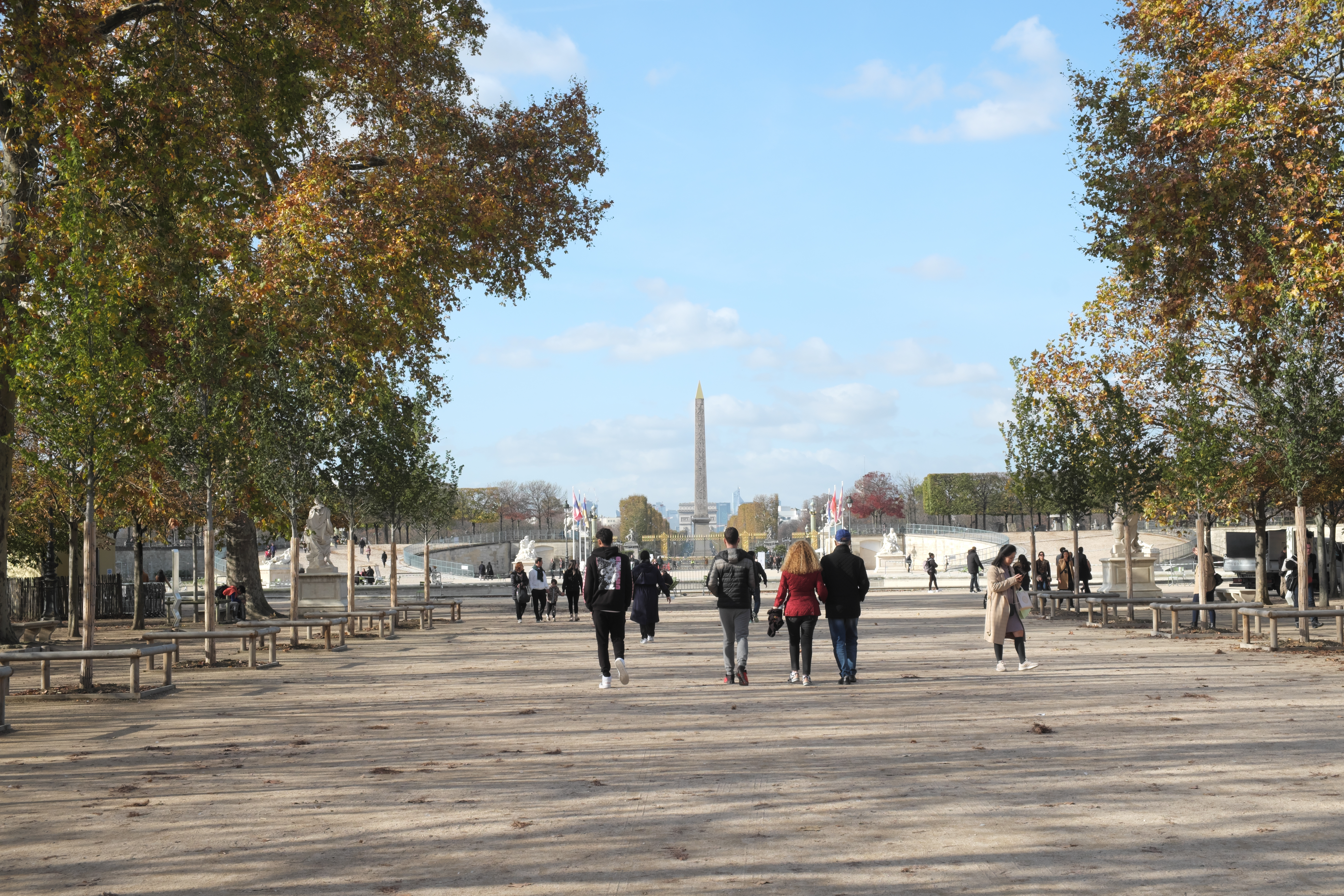
The Axe historique seen from the Tuileries Garden.

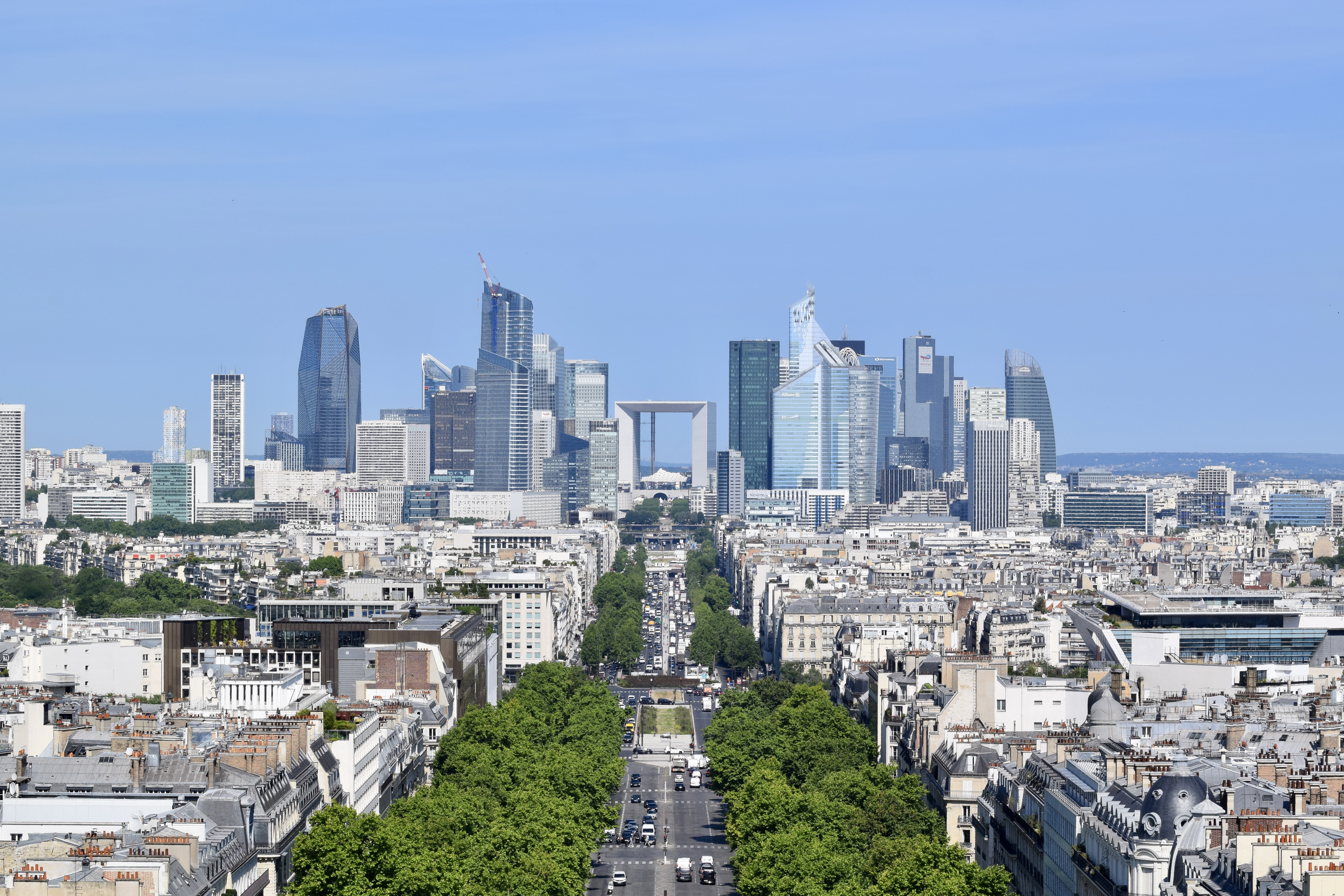
The Grande Arche seen from the Arc de Triomphe on the Axe historique.

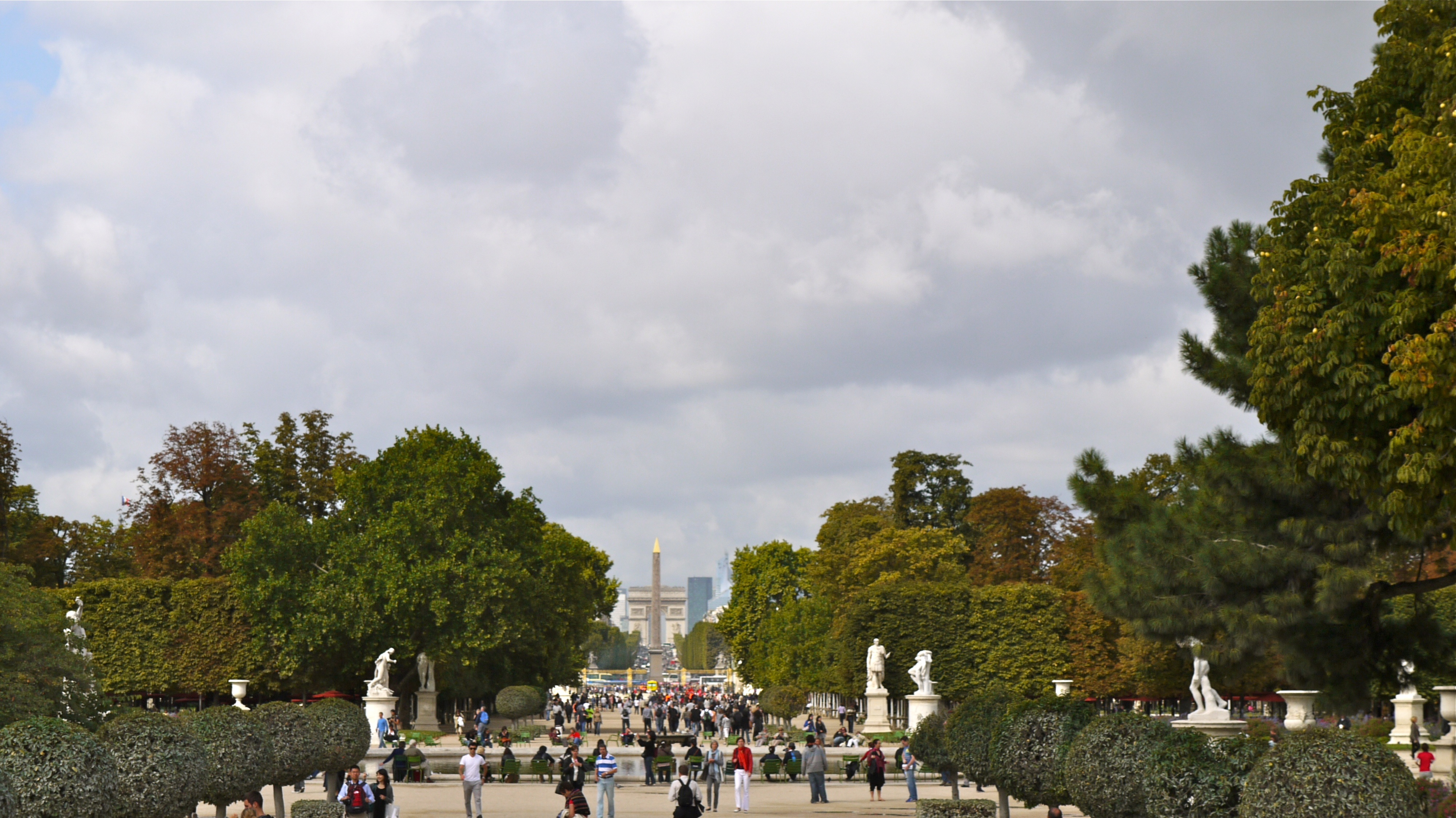
View from the Tuileries towards the Arc de Triomphe.

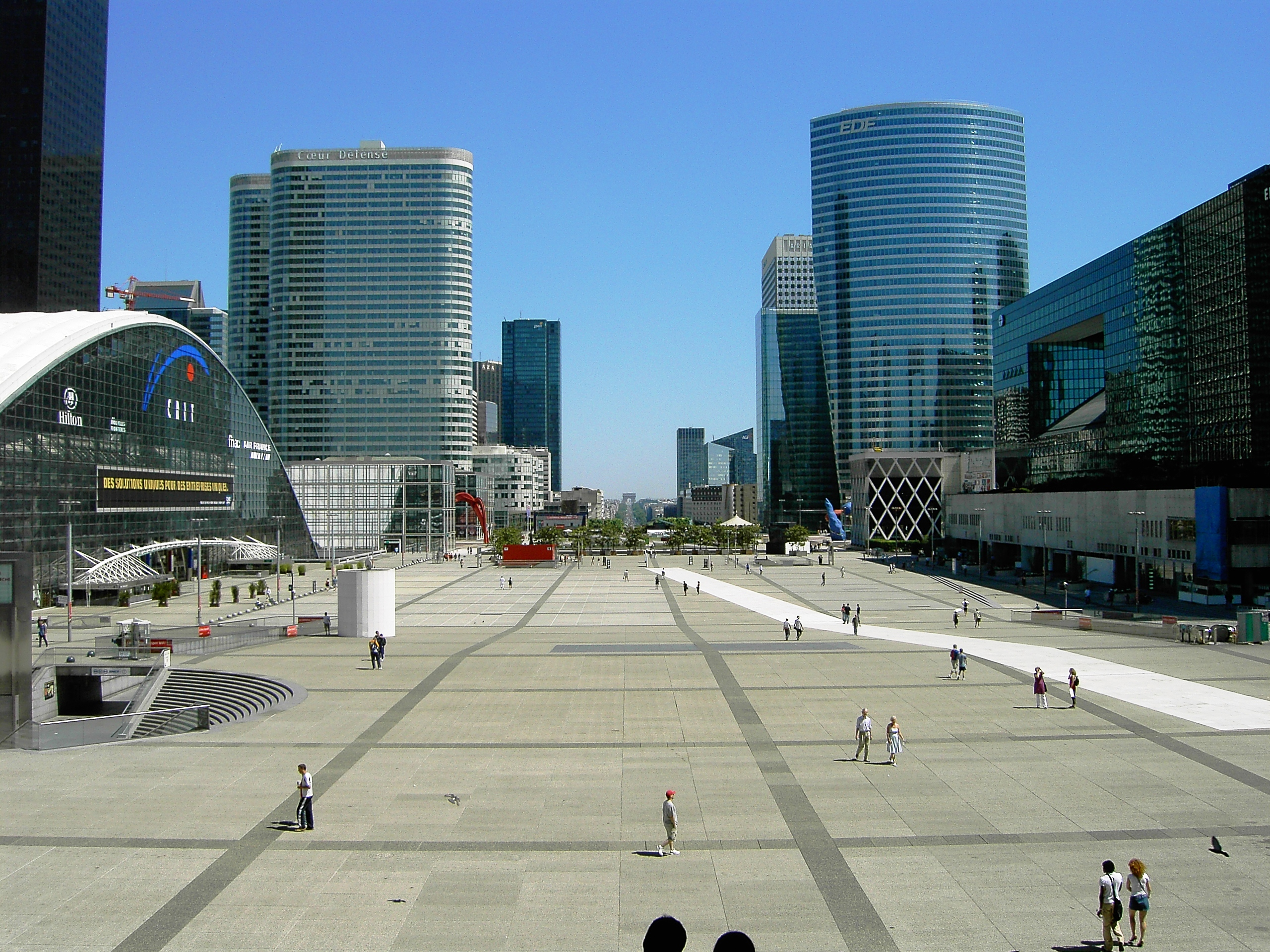
A view of the Arc de Triomphe from La Défense 5 km (3 mi) away.

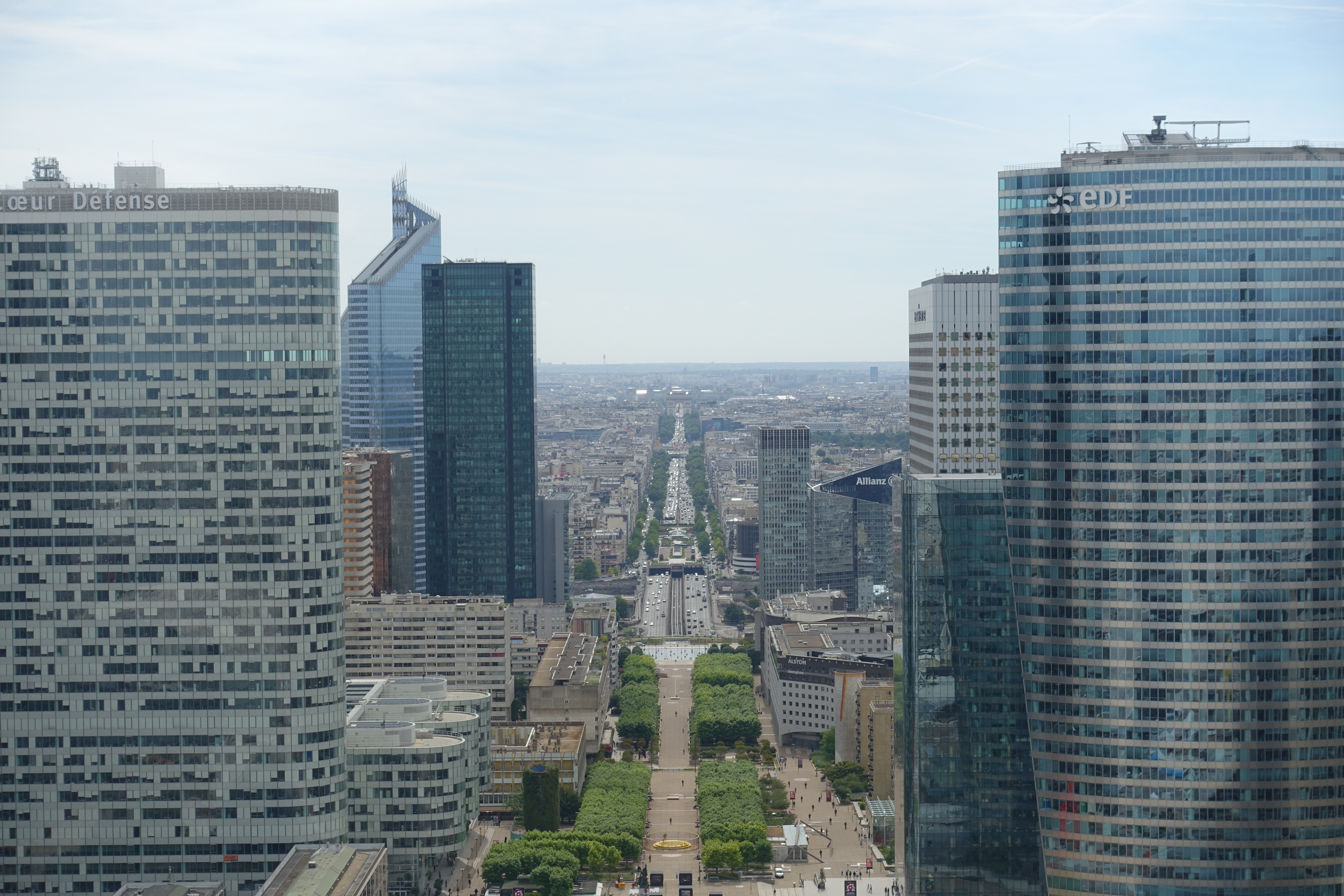
From the roof of the Grande Arche, past the skyscrapers of La Défense, down the Axe historique.

== See also ==
- Cosmological Axis of Yogyakarta – a similar axis in Yogyakarta.
- The North-South Central Axis of Beijing City – a similar axis in Beijing.
