= Tour Signal =

Proposed French skyscraper

Coordinates: 48°53′29″N 2°14′01″E

- Interactive map of the Tour Signal area

General information
- Status: Never built
- Type: Hotel, office and residential
- Location: La Défense (Puteaux, France)

Height
- Antenna spire: 301 m (988 ft)

Technical details
- Floor count: 71
- Floor area: 140,000 m^{2} (1,500,000 sq ft)

Design and construction
- Architect: Jean Nouvel
- Developer: Medea and Layetana
- Structural engineer: Desarollos Immobiliarios

Tour Signal was a proposed skyscraper in La Défense and in Puteaux, France.

== Design and development ==
Medea and Layetana were the developers with Ateliers Jean Nouvel as architects.

== Location ==
West Gate was chosen as the location for the building in order to open the La Défense district to the municipality of Puteaux. The project’s ambition was to create a stronger polarity at the heart of the Île-de-France and develop a major attraction while relating the project to its natural and built environment and, lastly, embodying the various elements which strengthen the feeling that the project belongs in the district.

== Outcome ==
The project was never built, and was cancelled in 2009. In 2009, Medea and Layetana announced they are not involved in the project anymore, and the new president of the EPAD Joëlle Ceccaldi-Raynaud declared her opposition to the tower which looks like an unaesthetic "monolith".

- Structural type: highrise
- Architectural style: modern
- Materials: glass, steel and concrete
- Design: http://skyscraperpage.com/cities/?buildingID=76763
