= Commerzbank Tower =

Skyscraper in Frankfurt, Germany

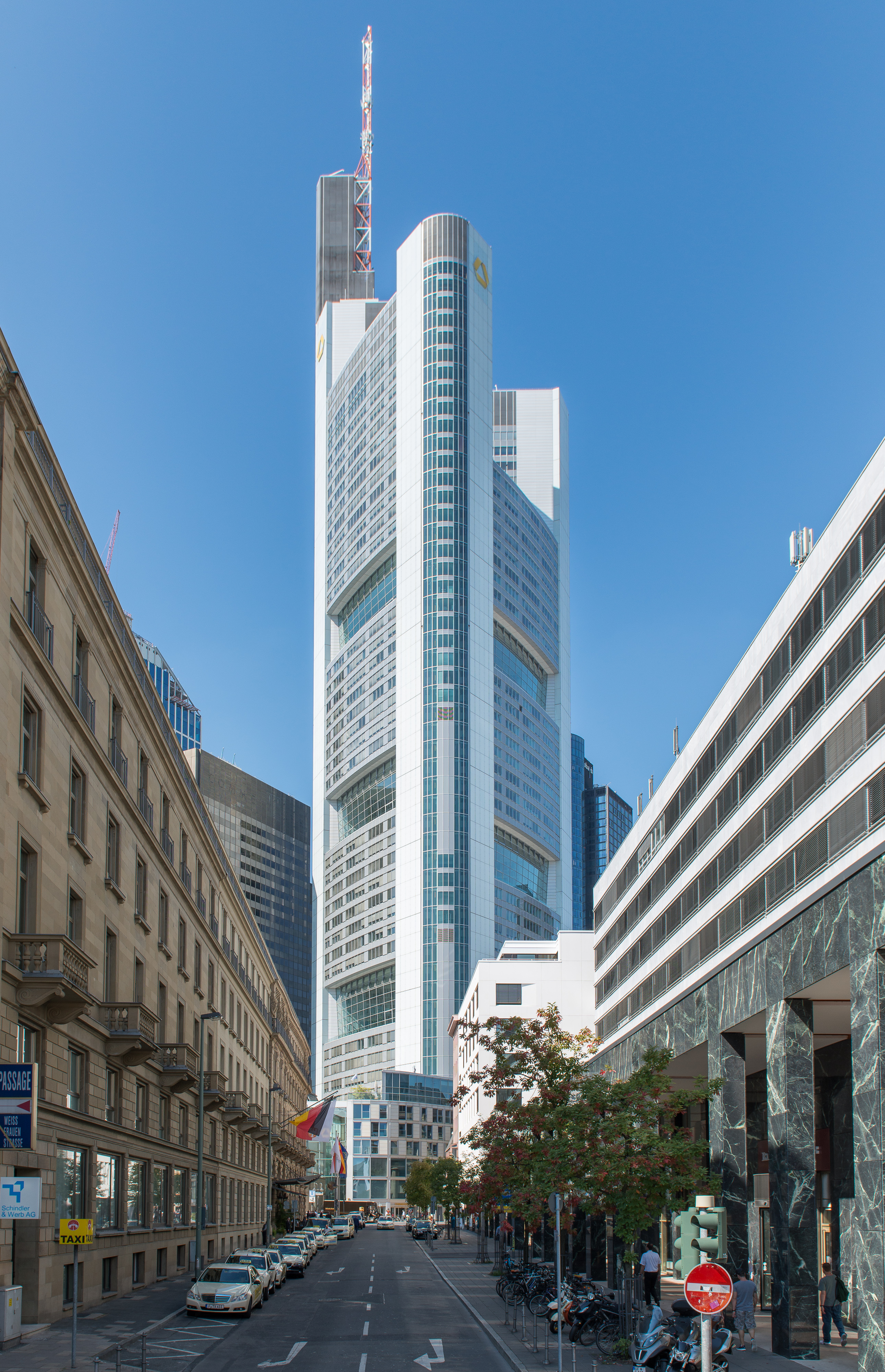

General information
- Type: Office
- Location: Kaiserplatz 1 Frankfurt; Hesse, Germany
- Coordinates: 50°06′40″N 8°40′28″E
- Construction started: 1994
- Opening: 1997
- Cost: DM600 million
- Owner: Samsung Insurance Corporation (sold for €620 million; sold-and-leased back until 2031 by Commerzbank)

Height
- Antenna spire: 300.1 m (985 ft)
- Roof: 258.7 m (849 ft)

Technical details
- Floor count: 56
- Floor area: 109,200 m^{2} (1,175,000 sq ft)

Design and construction
- Architect: Norman Foster
- Developer: Commerzbank
- Structural engineer: Arup; Krebs und Kiefer
- Main contractor: Hochtief AG

Other information
- Public transit: Willy-Brandt-Platz; 11 Willy-Brandt-Platz

Commerzbank Tower is a 56-story, 259 m (850 ft) skyscraper in the banking district of Frankfurt, Germany. Including an antenna spire on top, the tower has a total height of 300.1 m (985 ft), making it the tallest building in Germany and the second tallest building in the European Union.

Commerzbank Tower was designed by Foster & Partners, with Arup and Krebs & Kiefer (structural engineering), J. Roger Preston with P&A Petterson Ahrens (mechanical engineering), Schad & Hölzel (electrical engineering). Construction of the building began in 1994 and took three years to complete. The building provides 121,000 m^{2} (1,300,000 sq ft) of office space for the Commerzbank headquarters, including winter gardens and natural lighting and air circulation. The building is lighted at night with a yellow lighting scheme that was designed by Thomas Ende who won a competition.

In its immediate neighbourhood are other skyscrapers including the Eurotower (former home of the European Central Bank), the Main Tower, the Silberturm, the Japan Center and the Gallileo. The area forms Frankfurt's central business district, commonly known as Bankenviertel.

== Features ==
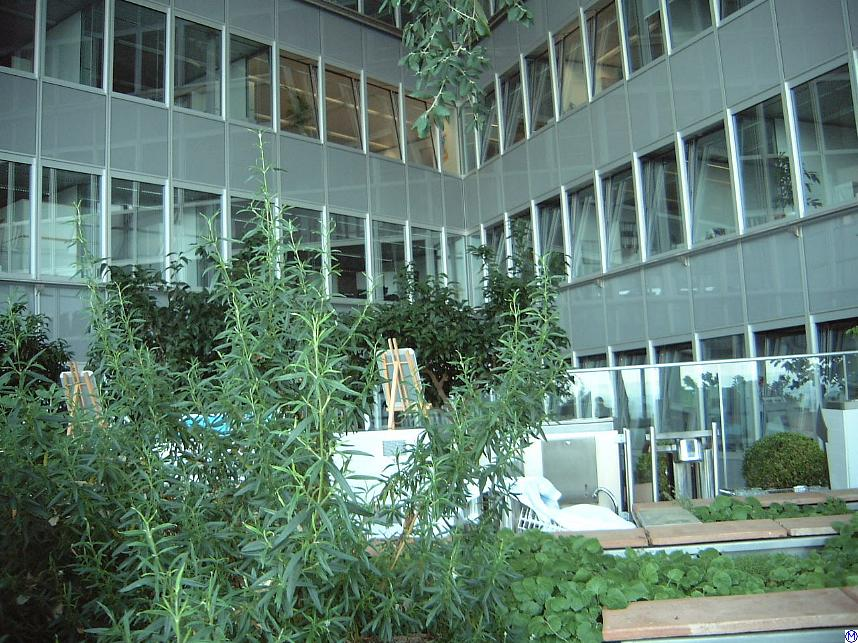
Garden on the 19th floor of Commerzbank Tower

When the building was planned in the early 1990s, Frankfurt's Green Party, who governed the city together with the Social Democratic Party, encouraged the Commerzbank to design a 'green' skyscraper. The result was the world's first so-called ecological skyscraper: besides the use of 'sky-gardens', environmentally friendly technologies were employed to reduce energy required for heating and cooling.

=== Sky gardens ===
Commerzbank Tower is shaped as a 60-metre-wide (197 ft) rounded equilateral triangle with a central, triangular atrium. At nine different levels, the atrium opens up to one of the three sides, forming large sky gardens. These open areas allow more natural light in the building, reducing the need for artificial lighting. At the same time it ensures offices in the building's two other sides have a view of either the city or the garden.

In order to eliminate the need of supporting columns in the sky gardens, the building was constructed in steel rather than the conventional (and cheaper) concrete. It was the first skyscraper in Germany where steel was used as the main construction material.

=== Height ===
It is a 56-story building, with the highest occupied floor at 190 m (620 ft). The roof is at a height of 259 m (850 ft). The antenna spire on top gives the tower a total height of 300.1 m (985 ft).

Since the departure of the United Kingdom from the European Union, the tower had briefly reclaimed its position as the tallest building in the European Union only to lose the title again in 2021 when Poland's Varso Tower topped out. The Commerzbank Tower is only two metres taller than the Messeturm, which is also located in Frankfurt and was the tallest building in Europe before the construction of the Commerzbank Tower.

== In popular culture ==
- Commerzbank Tower appears under the name Hurt Enterprise Headquarters as a vanilla stage 8 Euro-Contemporary building set in SimCity 4 (Deluxe or with Rush Hour).
- In 2007, Wrebbit released a 3D puzzle from the Towers Made To Scale Collection, which includes Commerzbank Tower and Messeturm in one box-set.
- In his 2011 book Boomerang, Michael Lewis describes a meeting with a German financier who claimed the top of the Commerzbank Tower contains a glass room that serves as a men's toilet from which, he joked, one could, "in full view of the world below, [void one's bowels] on Deutsche Bank."

== Gallery ==
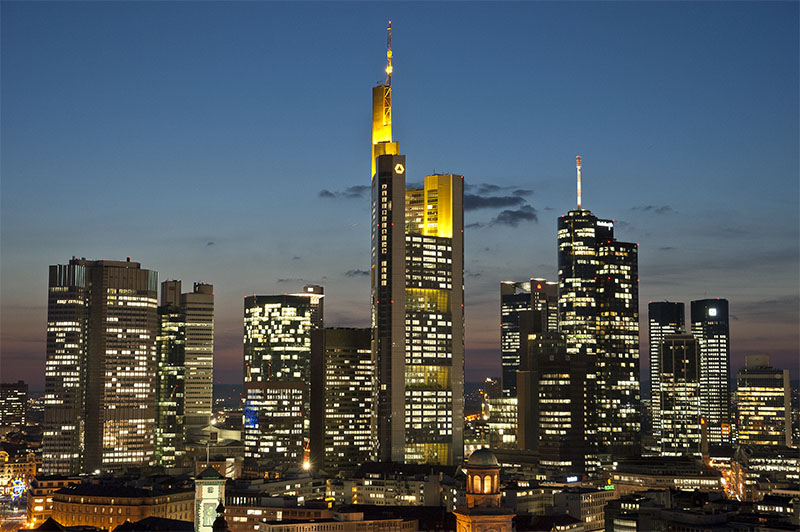
Commerzbank Tower at night, a focal point of the Frankfurt skyline

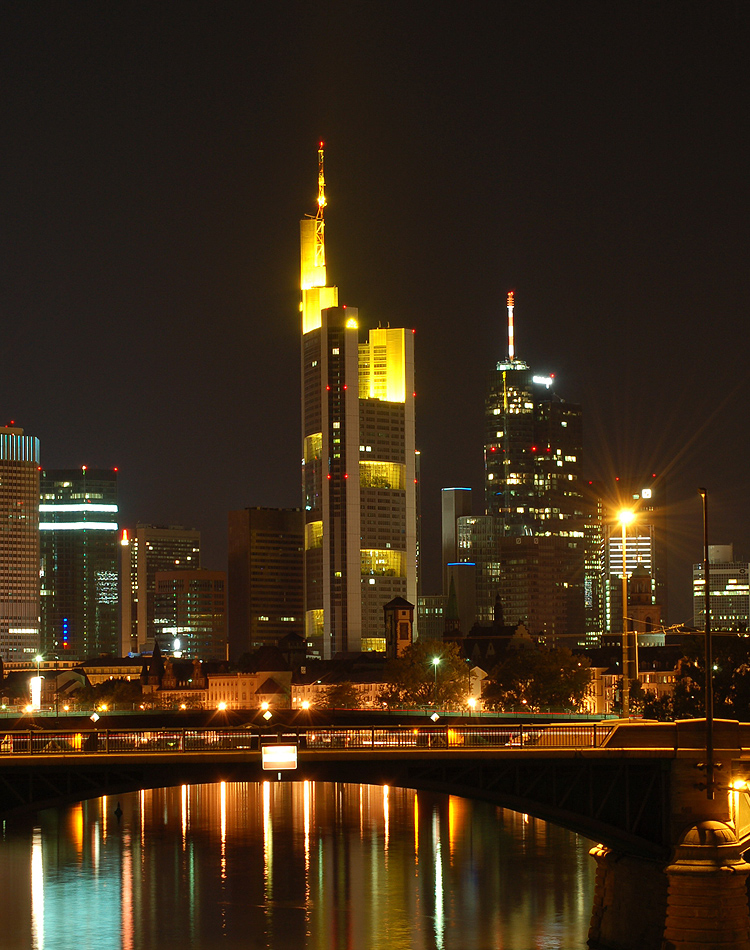
At night

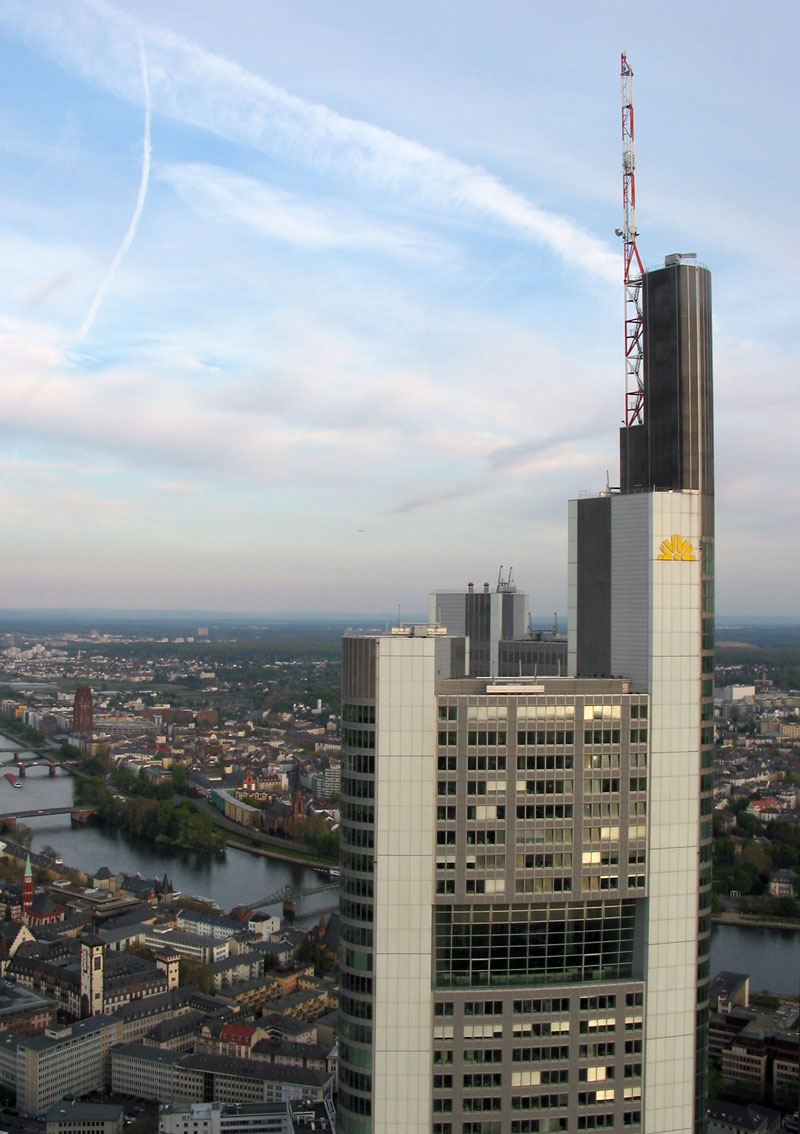
Seen from the top of the Main Tower

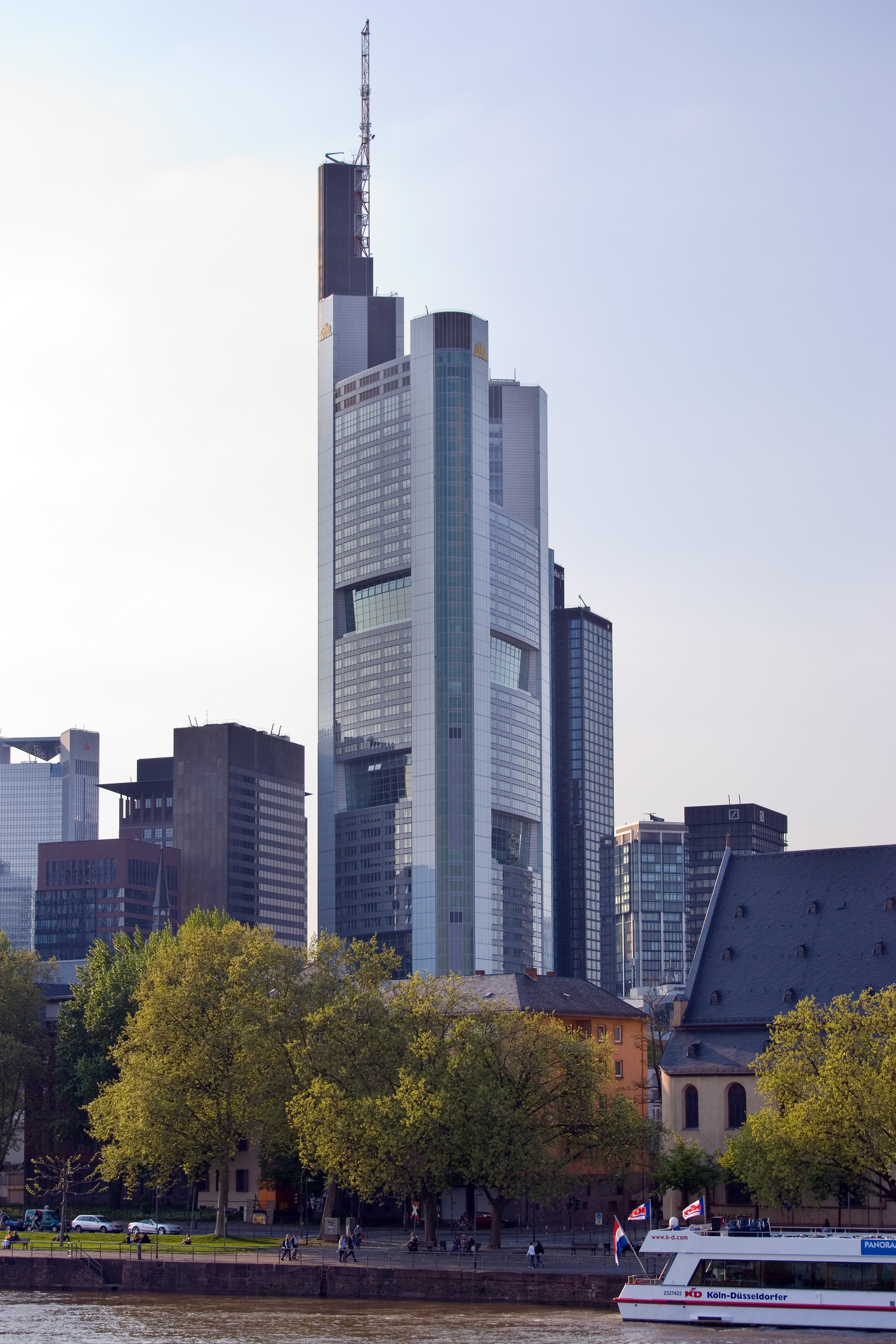
View from the Iron Bridge

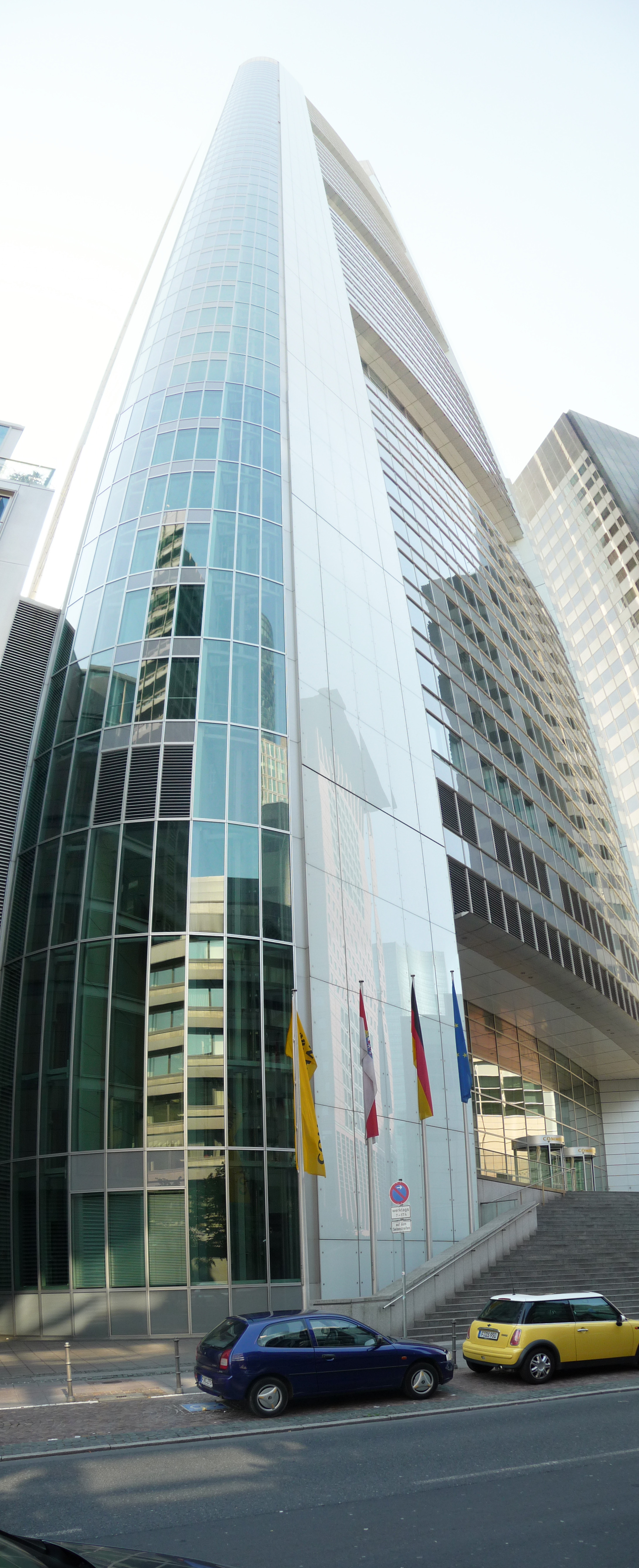
Street level view

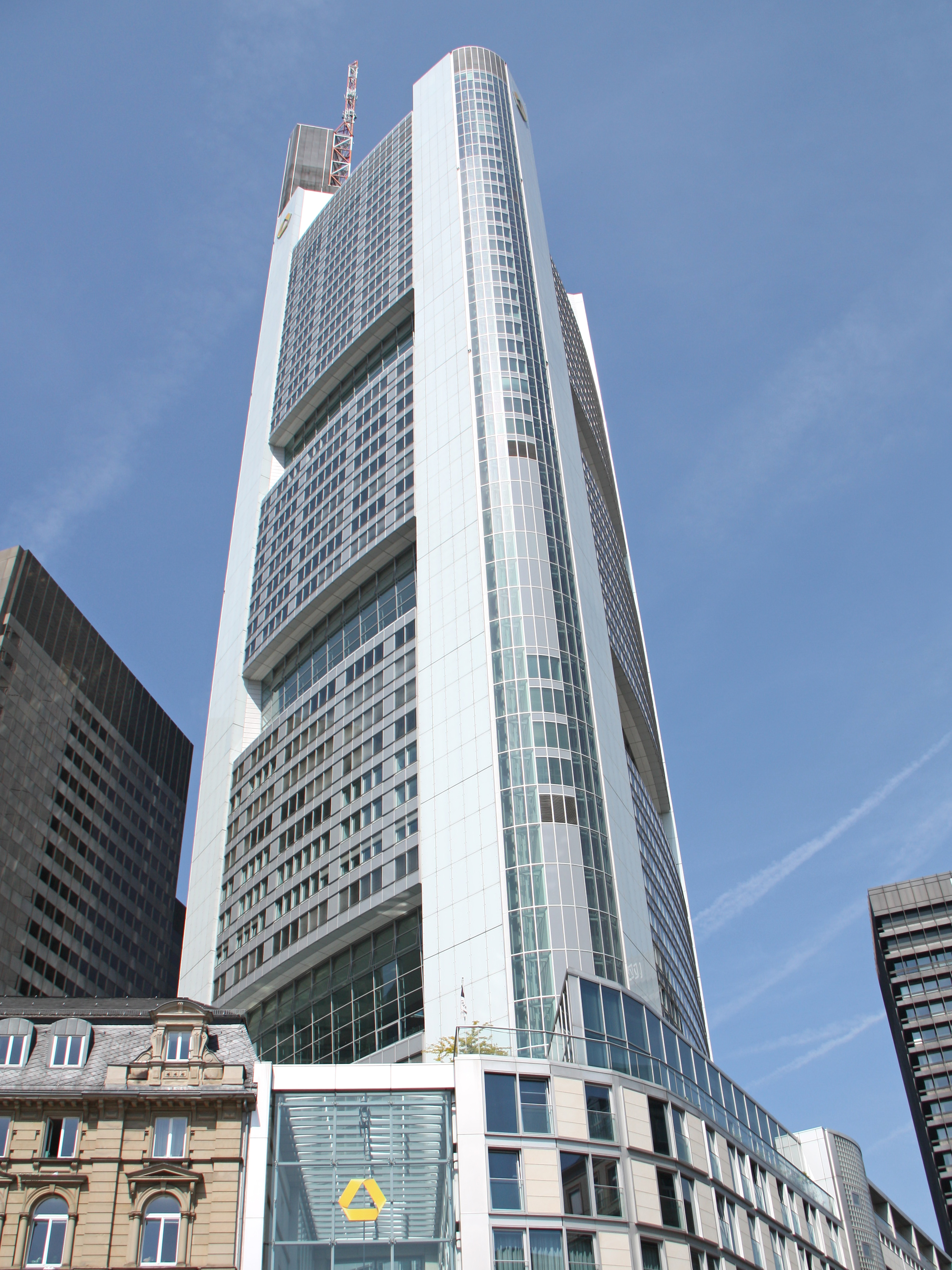
From Kaiserplatz

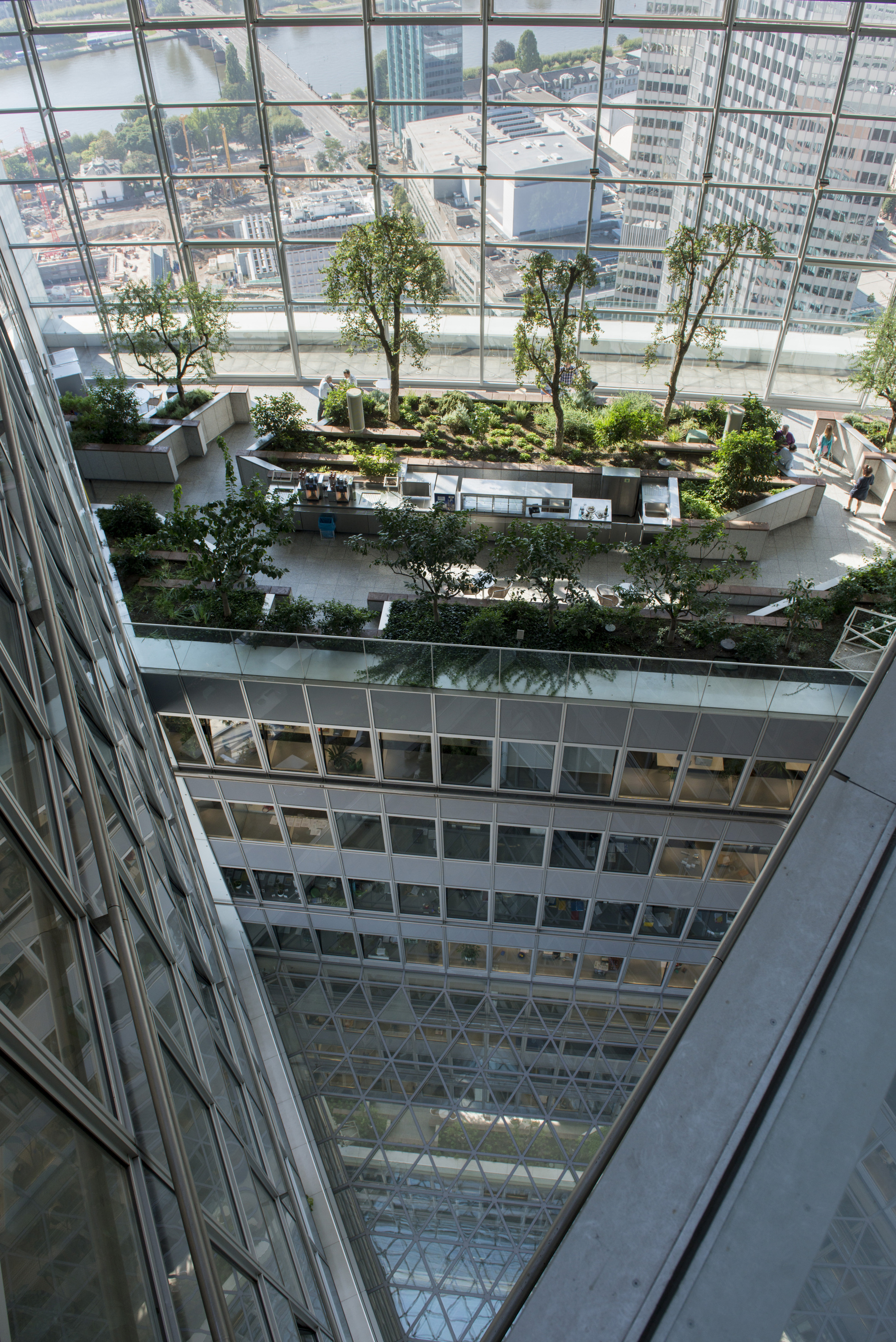
Interior

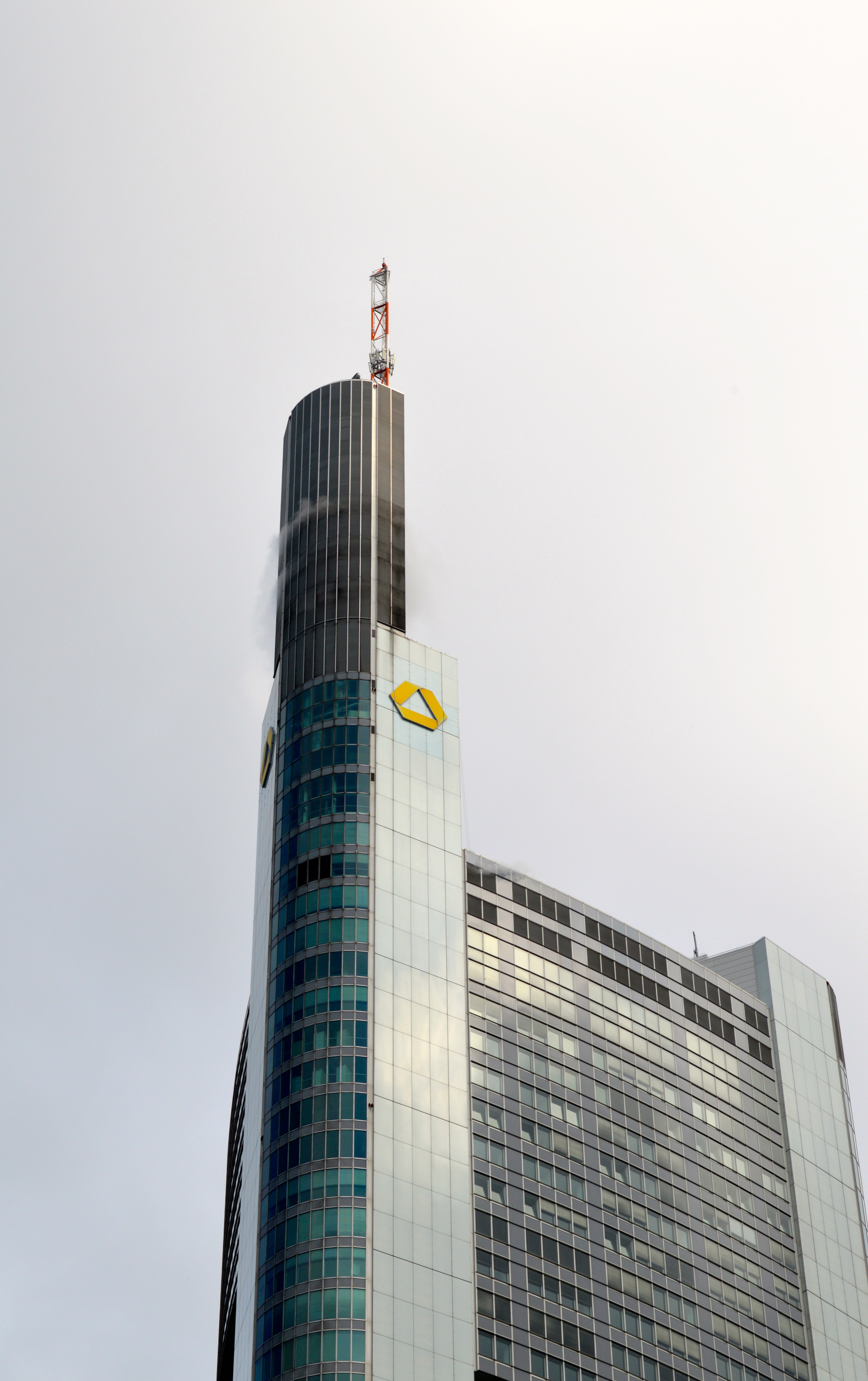
Close-up of the spire. Steam escapes from vents that are integrated into the spire cladding.

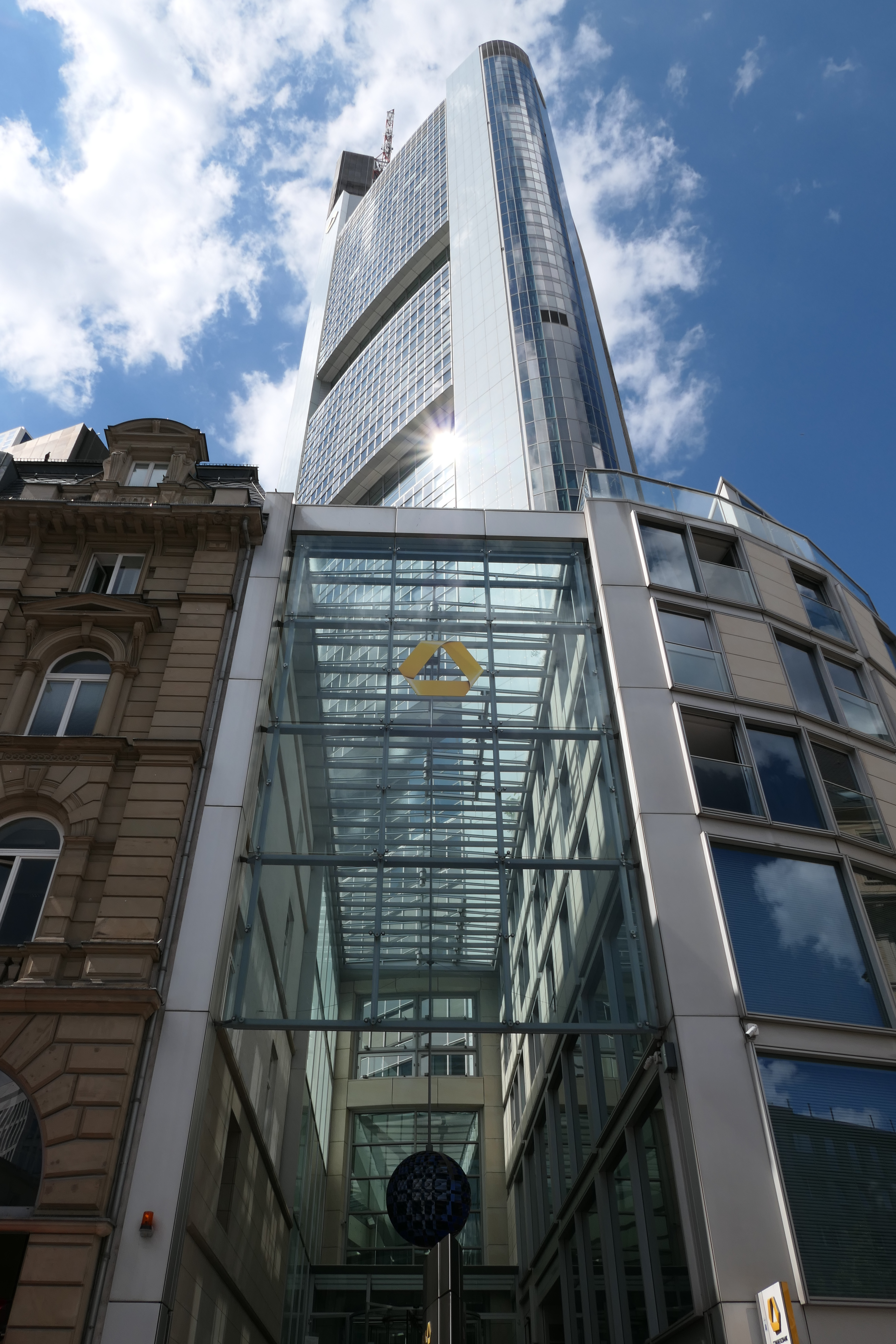
Entrance

== See also ==
- List of tallest buildings in Frankfurt
- List of tallest buildings in Germany
- List of skyscrapers

Records
Preceded by Messeturm	Tallest building in the European Union; 1990–1997; 259 metres (850 ft)	Succeeded by The Shard
