= Messeturm =

Skyscraper in Frankfurt, Germany

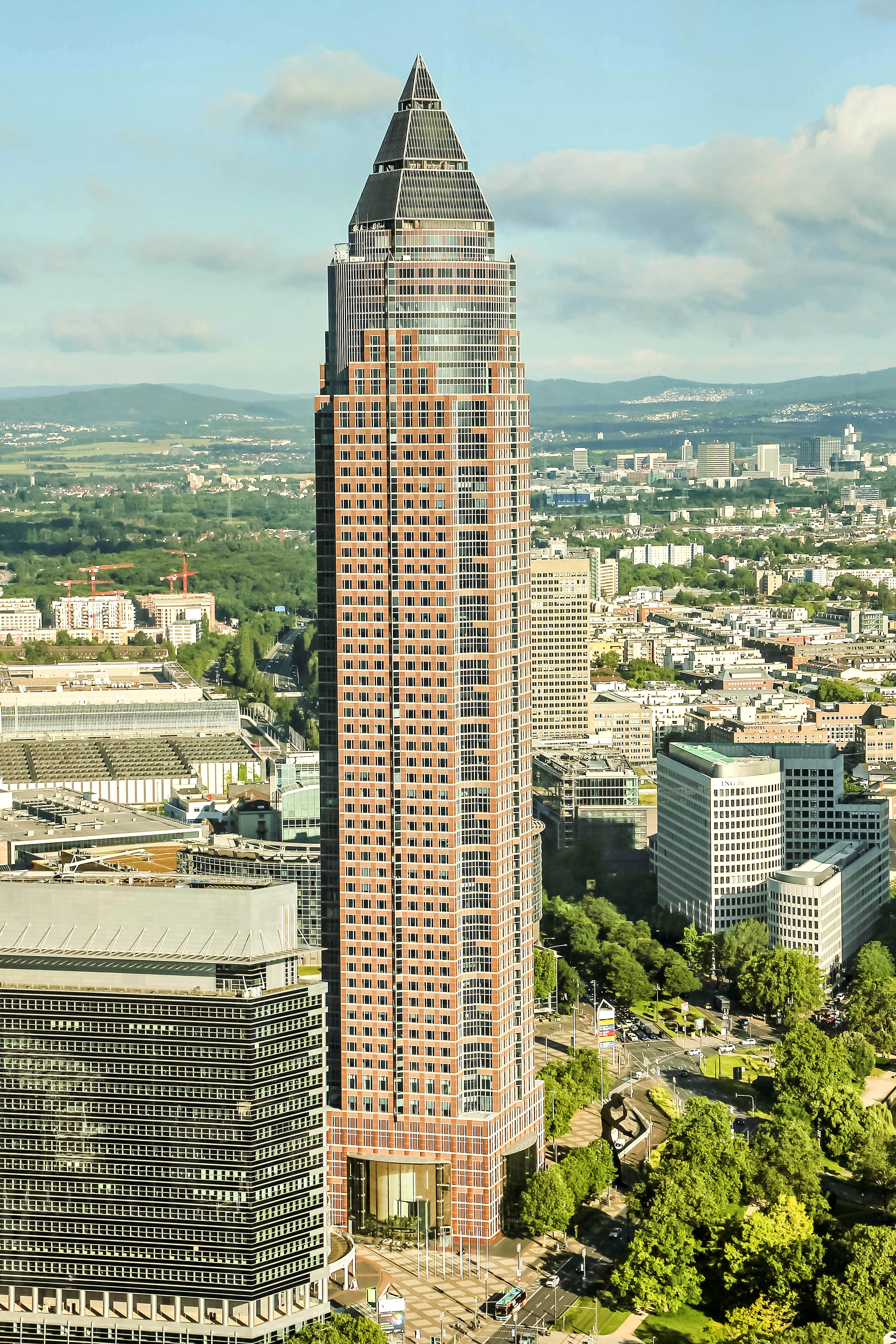
- Messeturm in 2024

General information
- Status: Completed
- Type: Commercial offices
- Architectural style: Art Deco, Postmodern
- Location: Friedrich-Ebert-Anlage 49; Frankfurt; Hesse, Germany
- Coordinates: 50°06′44″N 8°39′10″E
- Construction started: 13 July 1988
- Opening: October 1990
- Cost: DM500 million
- Owner: Tishman Speyer Properties

Height
- Roof: 257 m (843 ft)
- Top floor: 228 m (748 ft)

Technical details
- Floor count: 63; 2 below ground
- Floor area: 61,711 m^{2} (664,300 sq ft)

Design and construction
- Architects: Helmut Jahn; Richard Murphy
- Developer: Tishman Speyer Properties; CitiBank
- Structural engineer: Ingenieurbüro Fritz Nötzold
- Main contractor: HOCHTIEF AG

Other information
- Public transit: Festhalle/Messe; 16 17 Festhalle/Messe

Website
- messeturm.com

The Messeturm, or Trade Fair Tower, is a 63-storey, 257 m (843 ft) skyscraper in the Westend-Süd district of Frankfurt, Germany. It is the second tallest building in Frankfurt, the second tallest building in Germany and the third tallest building in the European Union. It was the tallest building in Europe from its completion in 1990 until 1997 when it was surpassed by the Commerzbank Tower, which is also located in Frankfurt.

The Messeturm is located near the Frankfurt Trade Fair grounds. Helmut Jahn designed the Messeturm in a postmodern architectural style. It is regarded as one of the design classics among European skyscrapers. Despite its name, the Messeturm is not used for trade fair exhibitions but as an office building. It is one of the few buildings in Germany with their own postal code (60308), the others being Opernturm, another Frankfurt skyscraper, and the summit station on Zugspitze.

When Germany submitted its application to have Frankfurt selected as the seat of the European Union's Anti-Money Laundering Authority (AMLA) in 2023, the Messeturm was one of three options – alongside Tower 185 – presented as potential location for the new agency.

== Planning and construction ==
In 1985, Messe Frankfurt organised an architectural competition for a new office tower, which was won by the Chicago-based architectural firm Murphy/Jahn. Construction of the Messeturm began on 13 July 1988. Tishman Speyer Properties developed the building, with Murphy/Jahn serving as the design architect.

A contemporary report published in March 1988 stated that Tishman Speyer would own and manage the project, while Citibank would provide its financing. The same report described the Messeturm as part of a ten-year renovation and expansion programme for the Frankfurt exhibition grounds.

The topping-out ceremony took place on 1 March 1990 and was attended by 1,600 guests. The first completed office floors were occupied on 1 October 1990.

== Design ==
The Messeturm is similar in design to towers by other architects including the Bank of America Plaza in Atlanta, Georgia and Key Tower (1991) in Cleveland, Ohio. Frankfurters often call it Bleistift ("pencil") due to its shape. The construction of the building's foundation set a world record for the longest continuous concrete pour. Ninety trucks poured concrete for 78 hours into the 6-metre (20 ft) deep foundation. Its ground floor area is just 1,681 m^{2} (18,090 sq ft), and features a 36.3 m (119.1 ft) pyramid at the top.

The tower uses numerous geometric shapes in its design such as the square footprint which is the main shape used throughout the tower. It then rises to a cylindrical shape which finally completes in a pyramid.

There are 900 parking places in a public parking garage and a direct connection to the subway.

== In popular culture ==
- SimCity series
  - MesseTurm appears under the name Hogan Wallace and White Insurance as a vanilla stage 8 Euro-Contemporary building set in SimCity 4 (Deluxe or with Rush Hour).
  - There is a building that has a similar appearance to the Messeturm in SimCity 3000.

== Gallery ==
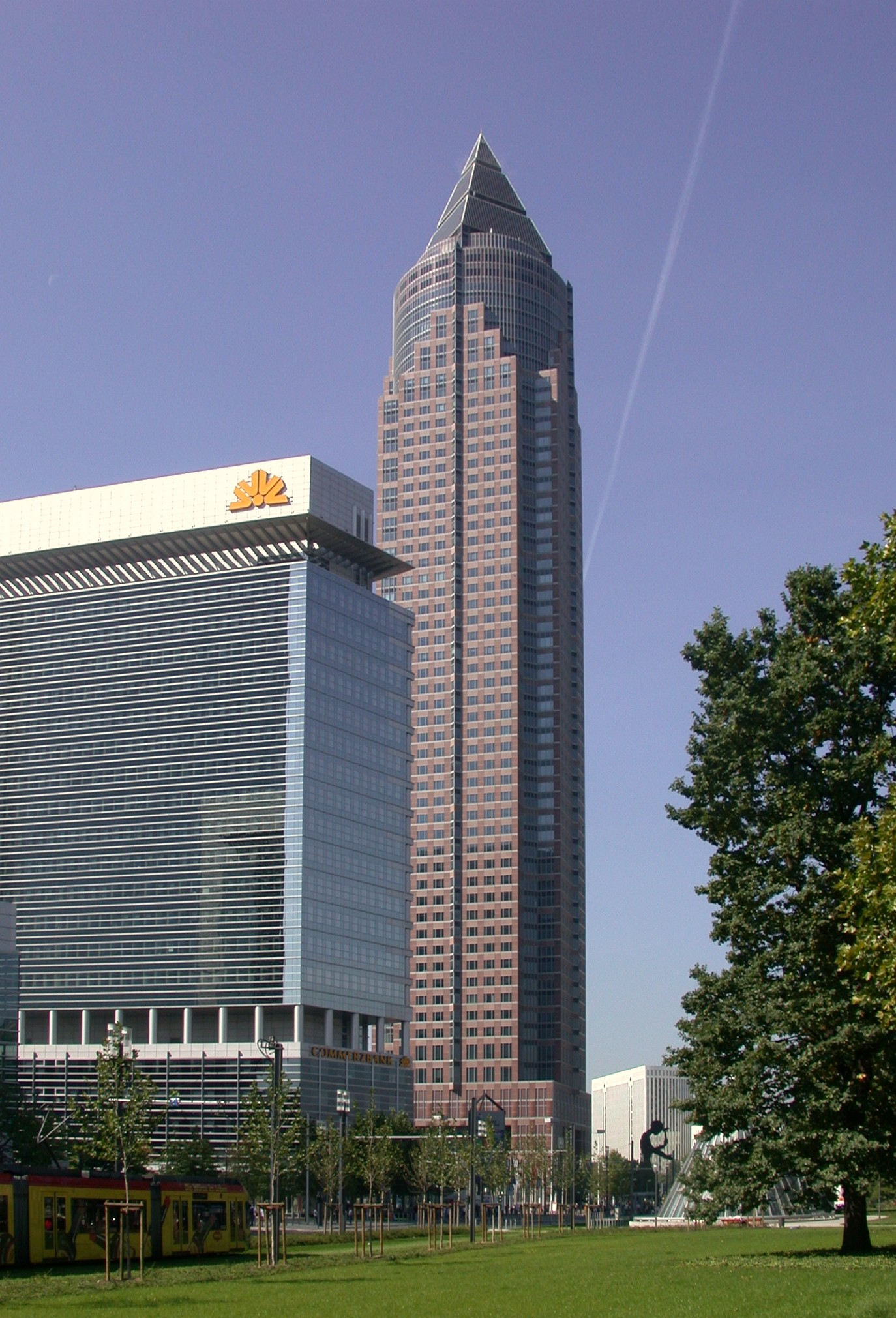
The inner city ring with Messeturm in the background

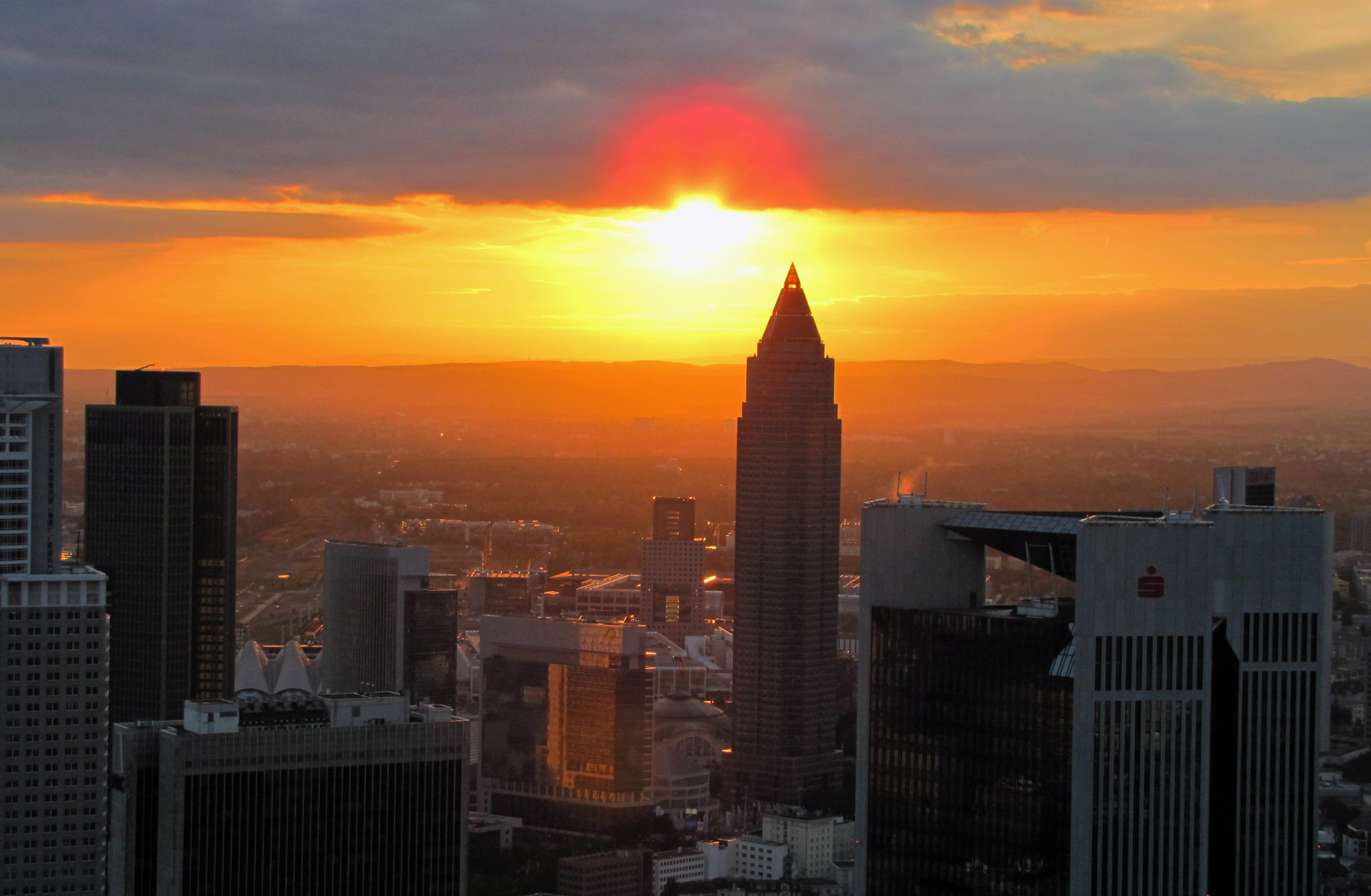
Messeturm at sunset

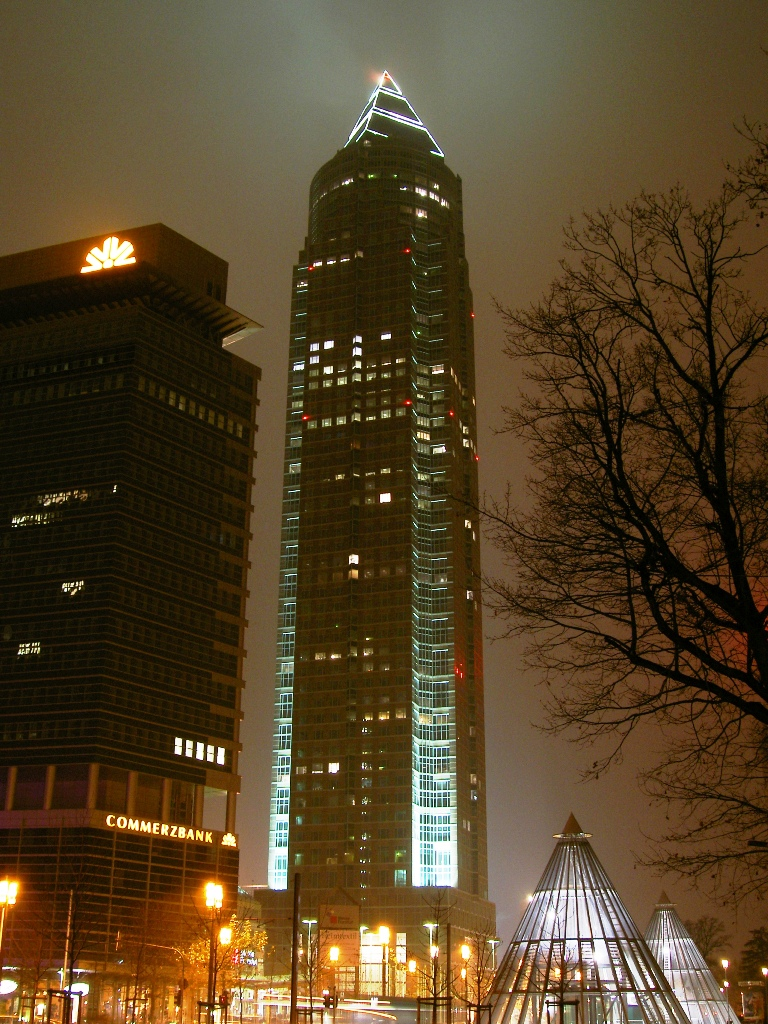
Messeturm at night

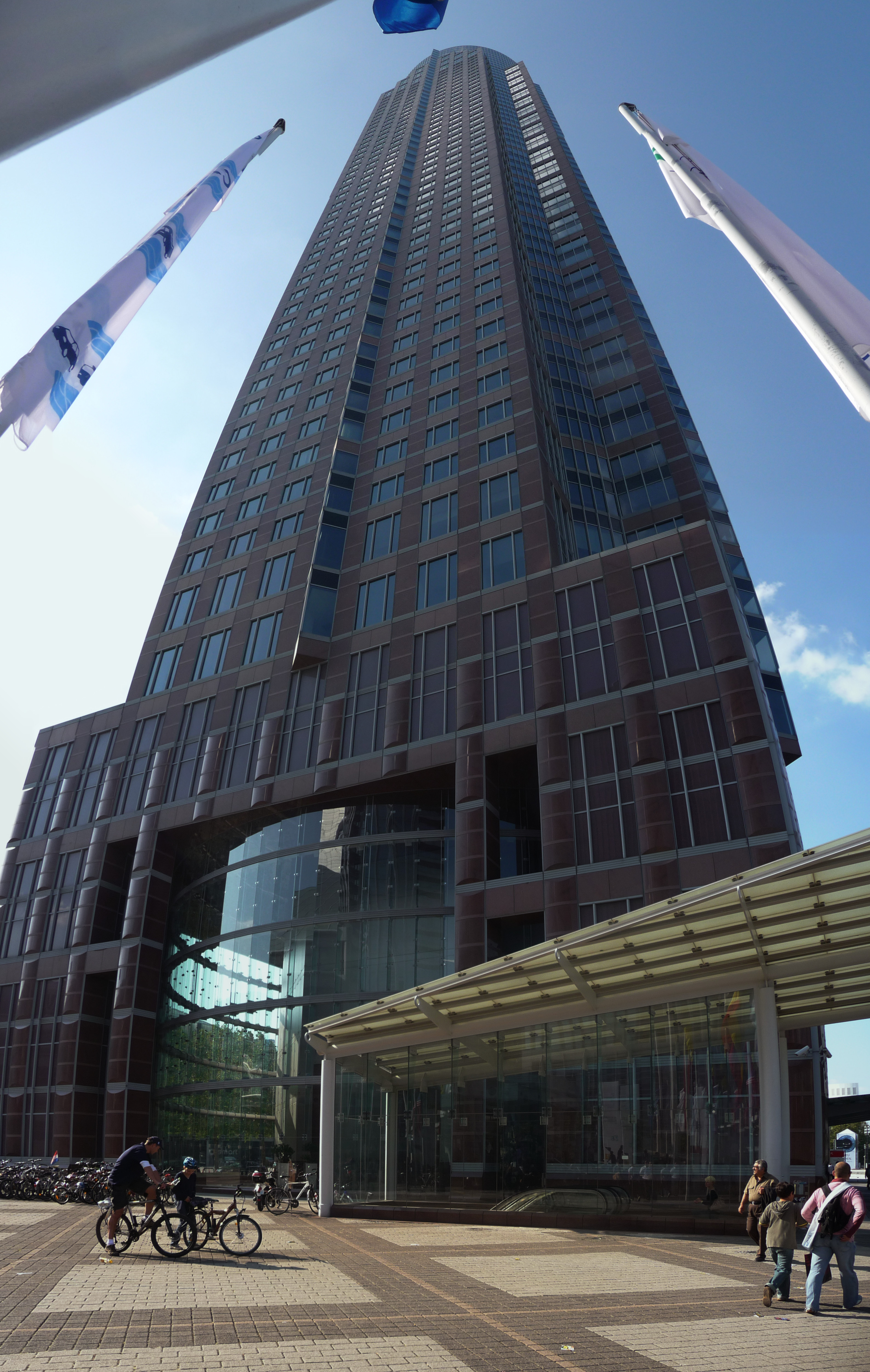
Messeturm from street level

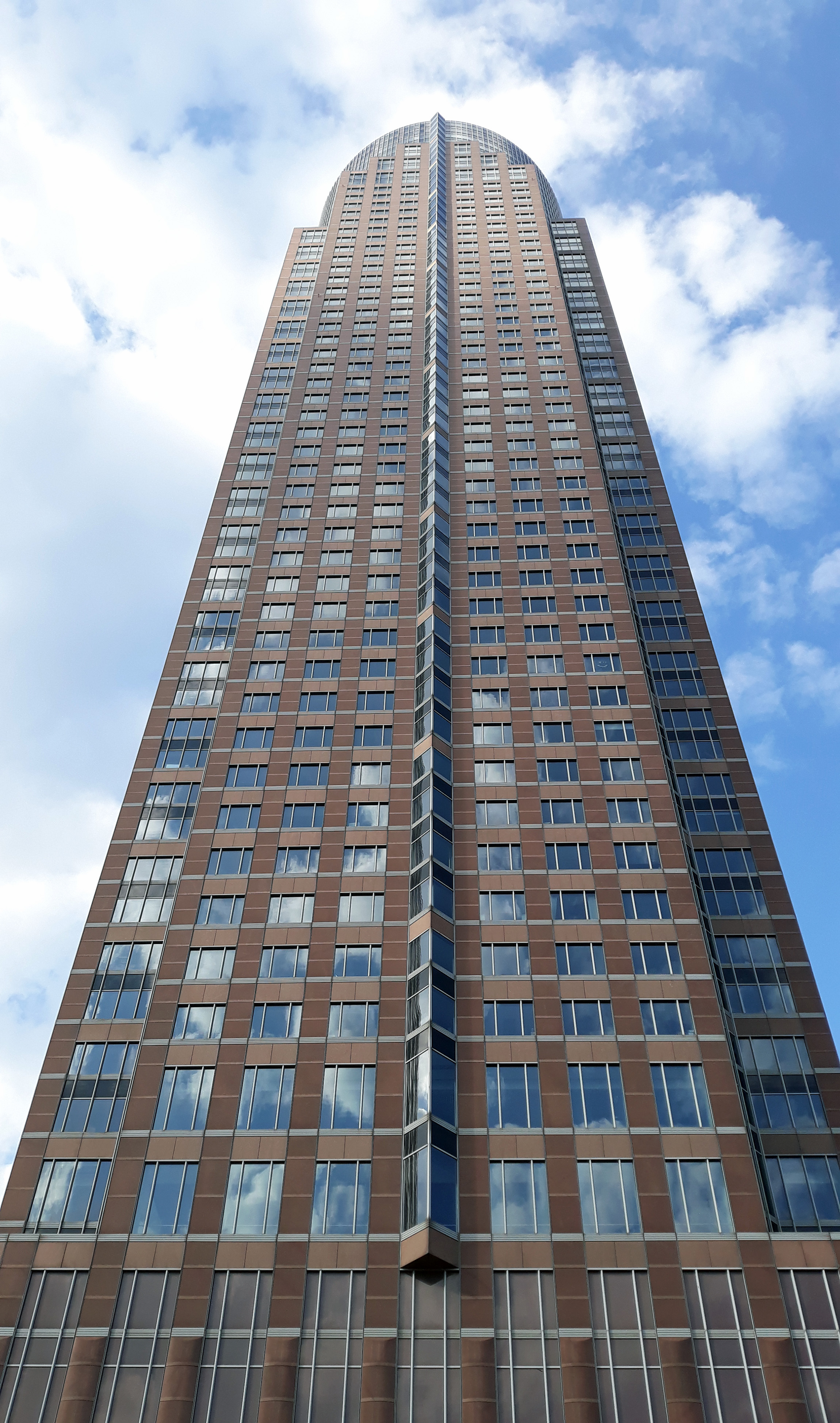
Messeturm from street level

== See also ==
- List of tallest buildings in Frankfurt
- List of tallest buildings in Germany
- List of tallest buildings in Europe

Records
Preceded by Silberturm	Tallest building in Germany; 1990–1997; 257 metres (843 ft)	Succeeded by Commerzbank Tower
Preceded by Tour Montparnasse	Tallest building in the European Union; 1990–1997; 257 metres (843 ft)	Succeeded by Commerzbank Tower
