= List of tallest buildings in the European Union =

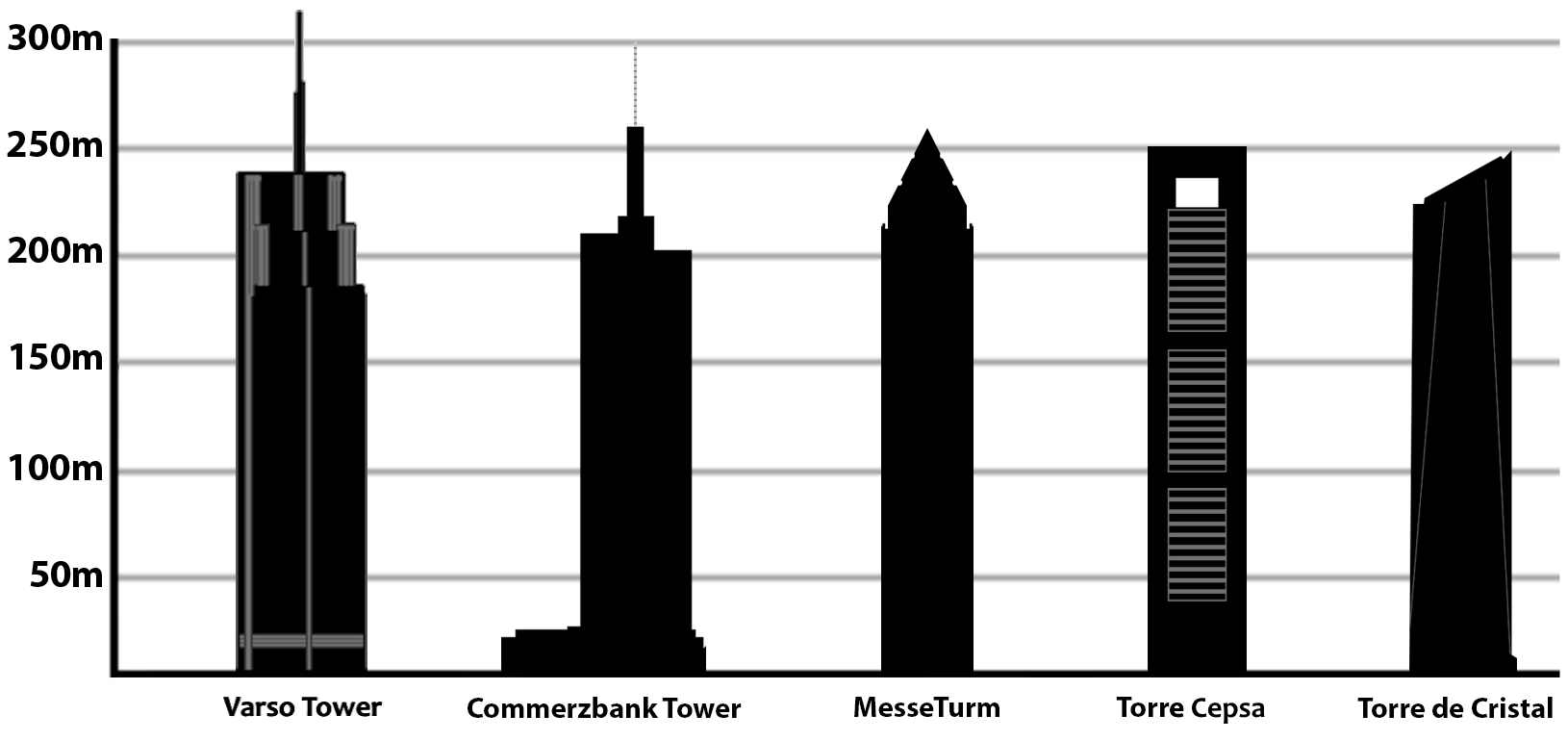
Tallest buildings in the European Union

This list ranks the tallest buildings in the European Union (EU) that stand at least 150 metres (492 ft) tall, based on standard height measurement. This means that spires and other architectural details are included in the official height, but not antenna masts, as it is defined by the Council on Tall Buildings and Urban Habitat. Only habitable buildings are ranked, which excludes radio masts and towers, observation towers, cathedrals, steeples, chimneys and other tall architectural structures.

Tall buildings are relatively rare within the EU compared to other regions of the world that have the know-how and capital to build skyscrapers. Only a few cities in the EU have a notable number of high-rises, best known are: Frankfurt, Warsaw, Madrid and Paris. Most skyscrapers in Europe can be found outside of the EU, notably in three cities: London, Moscow and Istanbul. As a result, out of the top 500 tallest buildings in the world, as of 2024, only one is in the EU. Since 20 February 2021 the tallest building in the EU has been the Varso Tower in Warsaw, Poland, which is 310 metres (1,017 ft) tall.

== Existing buildings ==
This list includes buildings under construction that have already been architecturally topped out. Architectural height is considered, so masts and other elements added after completion of building are not considered.

Was the union's tallest building upon completion
Was the country's tallest building upon completion

| Rank | Name | Image | City | Height in m (ft) | Floors | Year built |
|---|---|---|---|---|---|---|
| 1 | Varso Tower | | Warsaw | 310 m (1,017 ft) | 53 | 2022 |
| 2 | Commerzbank Tower | | Frankfurt | 259 m (850 ft) | 56 | 1997 |
| 3 | Messeturm | | Frankfurt | 256.4 m (841 ft) | 64 | 1990 |
| 4 | DC Tower 1 | | Vienna | 250 m (820 ft) | 60 | 2013 |
| 5 | Torre de Cristal | | Madrid | 249 m (817 ft) | 52 | 2009 |
| 6 | Torre Cepsa | | Madrid | 248.3 m (815 ft) | 45 | 2008 |
| 7 | Karlatornet | | Gothenburg | 246 m (807 ft) | 74 | 2024 |
| 8 | Palace of Culture and Science | | Warsaw | 237 m (778 ft) | 42 | 1955 |
| 9 | Torre PwC | | Madrid | 236 m (774 ft) | 52 | 2008 |
| 10 | Four I | | Frankfurt | 233 m (764 ft) | 59 | 2024 |
| 11 | Tour First | | Paris | 231 m (758 ft) | 52 | 2011 |
| 12 | Torre Emperador | | Madrid | 224.2 m (736 ft) | 57 | 2008 |
| 13 | Olszynki Park | | Rzeszów | 220.67 m (724 ft) | 42 | 2024 |
| 14 | Warsaw Spire | | Warsaw | 220 m (722 ft) | 49 | 2016 |
| 14 | Tour Hekla | | Paris | 220 m (722 ft) | 48 | 2022 |
| 16 | UniCredit Tower | | Milan | 217.7 m (714 ft) | 35 | 2011 |
| 17 | De Zalmhaven | | Rotterdam | 215 m (705 ft) | 58 | 2021 |
| 18 | Sky Tower | | Wrocław | 212 m (696 ft) | 50 | 2012 |
| 19 | Allianz Tower | | Milan | 209 m (686 ft) | 50 | 2014 |
| 20 | Tour Montparnasse | | Paris | 209 m (686 ft) | 59 | 1972 |
| 20 | Piedmont Region Headquarters | | Turin | 209 m (686 ft) | 42 | 2021 |
| 22 | Westendstraße 1 | | Frankfurt | 208 m (682 ft) | 53 | 1993 |
| 22 | Warsaw Trade Tower | | Warsaw | 208 m (682 ft) | 43 | 1999 |
| 24 | Intempo | | Benidorm | 202.5 m (664 ft) | 55 | 2021 |
| 25 | Millennium Tower | | Vienna | 202 m (663 ft) | 50 | 1999 |
| 26 | Warsaw Unit | | Warsaw | 200.7 m (658 ft) | 46 | 2021 |
| 27 | Main Tower | | Frankfurt | 200 m (656 ft) | 55 | 1999 |
| 27 | Tower 185 | | Frankfurt | 200 m (656 ft) | 55 | 2011 |
| 27 | Tour Incity | | Lyon | 200 m (656 ft) | 39 | 2015 |
| 30 | Skyliner | | Warsaw | 195 m (640 ft) | 45 | 2021 |
| 31 | Tour Majunga | | Paris | 194 m (636 ft) | 45 | 2014 |
| 32 | Złota 44 | | Warsaw | 192 m (630 ft) | 54 | 2012 |
| 33 | ONE | | Frankfurt | 191 m (627 ft) | 49 | 2022 |
| 34 | Turning Torso | | Malmö | 190 m (623 ft) | 54 | 2005 |
| 35 | Omniturm | | Frankfurt | 189.9 m (623 ft) | 45 | 2019 |
| 36 | Trianon | | Frankfurt | 186 m (610 ft) | 45 | 1993 |
| 36 | Gran Hotel Bali | | Benidorm | 186 m (610 ft) | 52 | 2002 |
| 38 | Tour GDF Suez | | Paris | 185 m (607 ft) | 37 | 2008 |
| 38 | European Central Bank Headquarters | | Frankfurt | 185 m (607 ft) | 45 | 2014 |
| 40 | Tour Granite | | Paris | 183 m (600 ft) | 35 | 2008 |
| 41 | Caleido Tower | | Madrid | 181 m (594 ft) | 38 | 2021 |
| 42 | Olivia Star | | Gdańsk | 180.6 m (593 ft) | 47 | 2018 |
| 43 | Sevilla Tower | | Seville | 180.5 m (592 ft) | 40 | 2016 |
| 44 | Danube Flats | | Vienna | 182 m (597 ft) | 48 | 2024 |
| 44 | Grand Tower | | Frankfurt | 180 m (591 ft) | 47 | 2019 |
| 44 | Tours Duo 1 | | Paris | 180 m (591 ft) | 39 | 2021 |
| 47 | Tour Total | | Paris | 179 m (587 ft) | 48 | 1985 |
| 47 | Tour CB21 | | Paris | 179 m (587 ft) | 42 | 1974 |
| 47 | Four II | | Frankfurt | 179 m (587 ft) | 47 | 2025 |
| 50 | Tour Areva | | Paris | 178 m (584 ft) | 44 | 1974 |
| 50 | Tour Saint-Gobain | | Paris | 178 m (584 ft) | 39 | 2019 |
| 52 | Generali Tower | | Milan | 177.4 m (582 ft) | 44 | 2017 |
| 53 | Estrel Tower | | Berlin | 176 m (577 ft) | 45 | 2025 |
| 54 | Libeskind Tower | | Milan | 175.5 m (576 ft) | 34 | 2021 |
| 55 | DC Tower 2 | | Vienna | 175 m (574 ft) | 53 | 2026 |
| 56 | The Bridge | | Warsaw | 174 m (571 ft) | 40 | 2025 |
| 57 | Tour D2 | | Paris | 171 m (561 ft) | 37 | 2014 |
| 58 | Opernturm | | Frankfurt | 170 m (558 ft) | 42 | 2010 |
| 58 | Taunusturm | | Frankfurt | 170 m (558 ft) | 40 | 2014 |
| 58 | ONE | | Limassol | 170 m (558 ft) | 37 | 2021 |
| 58 | Trilogy West Tower | | Limassol | 170 m (558 ft) | 39 | 2024 |
| 62 | Eurovea Tower | | Bratislava | 168 m (551 ft) | 46 | 2023 |
| 63 | Tours Société Générale (Tour Alicante) | | Paris | 167 m (548 ft) | 37 | 1995 |
| 63 | Tours Société Générale (Tour Chassagne) | | Paris | 167 m (548 ft) | 37 | 1995 |
| 63 | Torre Intesa Sanpaolo | | Turin | 167 m (548 ft) | 39 | 2014 |
| 66 | Silberturm | | Frankfurt | 166 m (545 ft) | 32 | 1978 |
| 66 | Tour Carpe Diem | | Paris | 166 m (545 ft) | 34 | 2013 |
| 68 | Cosmopolitan Twarda 2/4 | | Warsaw | 165.4 m (543 ft) | 46 | 2013 |
| 69 | Tour Part-Dieu | | Lyon | 165 m (541 ft) | 42 | 1977 |
| 69 | Maastoren | | Rotterdam | 165 m (541 ft) | 44 | 2009 |
| 69 | Torre Iberdrola | | Bilbao | 165 m (541 ft) | 41 | 2011 |
| 72 | InterContinental Warsaw | | Warsaw | 164 m (538 ft) | 45 | 2003 |
| 73 | Post Tower | | Bonn | 162 m (531 ft) | 41 | 2002 |
| 73 | IZD Tower | | Vienna | 162 m (531 ft) | 41 | 2001 |
| 75 | Cœur Défense | | Paris | 161 m (528 ft) | 40 | 2001 |
| 75 | Palazzo Lombardia | | Milan | 161 m (528 ft) | 44 | 2010 |
| 77 | Tour Alto | | Paris | 160 m (525 ft) | 38 | 2020 |
| 77 | Trilogy East Tower | | Limassol | 160 m (525 ft) | 35 | 2024 |
| 79 | Tribunal de Paris | | Paris | 159.7 m (524 ft) | 38 | 2018 |
| 80 | Westend Gate | | Frankfurt | 159 m (522 ft) | 47 | 1976 |
| 80 | Rondo 1 | | Warsaw | 159 m (522 ft) | 40 | 2006 |
| 80 | Q22 | | Warsaw | 159 m (522 ft) | 47 | 2016 |
| 83 | Torre Lúgano | | Benidorm | 158 m (518 ft) | 43 | 2007 |
| 83 | New Orleans | | Rotterdam | 158 m (518 ft) | 43 | 2010 |
| 83 | Tour Trinity | | Paris | 157 m (515 ft) | 33 | 2020 |
| 86 | Torre Picasso | | Madrid | 156 m (512 ft) | 43 | 1988 |
| 87 | Vienna Twentytwo Tower | | Vienna | 155 m (509 ft) | 45 | 2026 |
| 87 | Deutsche Bank I | | Frankfurt | 155 m (509 ft) | 40 | 1984 |
| 87 | Deutsche Bank II | | Frankfurt | 155 m (509 ft) | 38 | 1984 |
| 87 | Torre Eurosky | | Rome | 155 m (509 ft) | 35 | 2012 |
| 87 | Tour Egée | | Paris | 155 m (509 ft) | 40 | 1999 |
| 87 | Tour Adria | | Paris | 155 m (509 ft) | 40 | 2002 |
| 87 | Marienturm | | Frankfurt | 155 m (509 ft) | 38 | 2019 |
| 87 | Cooltoren | | Rotterdam | 153.7 m (504 ft) | 50 | 2022 |
| 95 | Torre Mapfre | | Barcelona | 154 m (505 ft) | 40 | 1992 |
| 95 | Hotel Arts | | Barcelona | 154 m (505 ft) | 44 | 1994 |
| 95 | Skyper | | Frankfurt | 154 m (505 ft) | 38 | 2004 |
| 98 | Vienna TwentyTwo | | Vienna | 153 m (502 ft) | 42 | 2025 |
| 99 | Tour Ariane | | Paris | 152 m (499 ft) | 36 | 1975 |
| 99 | Montevideo | | Rotterdam | 152 m (499 ft) | 43 | 2005 |
| 101 | De Rotterdam | | Rotterdam | 151.3 m (496 ft) | 44 | 2013 |
| 102 | Gebouw Delftse Poort I | | Rotterdam | 151 m (495 ft) | 41 | 1991 |
| 103 | Rembrandt Tower | | Amsterdam | 150 m (492 ft) | 41 | 1992 |
| 103 | Hochhaus Neue Donau | | Vienna | 150 m (492 ft) | 33 | 2002 |

=== Buildings by pinnacle height ===
Some skyscraper enthusiasts prefer this measurement, claiming that the extensions that can or cannot be deemed "architectural" are subjective. However, many non-architectural extensions (such as radio antennas) are easily added and removed from tall buildings without significantly changing the style and design of the building, which is seen as a significant part of the value of these buildings.

The list includes all skyscrapers of at least 180 metres (591 ft) tall. However the height data is subject to fluctuations due to simple changing of mast extensions. This list includes buildings under construction that have already been architecturally topped out.

| bold | †Denotes building with pinnacle height higher than architectural |

| Name | City | Height in m (ft) | Floors | Completed |
|---|---|---|---|---|
| Varso Tower | Warsaw | 310 m (1,017 ft) | 53 | 2021 |
| Commerzbank Tower† | Frankfurt | 300 m (984 ft) | 56 | 1997 |
| Allianz Tower† | Milan | 259 m (850 ft) | 50 | 2014 |
| Messeturm | Frankfurt | 256.5 m (842 ft) | 55 | 1990 |
| DC Towers† | Vienna | 250 m (820 ft) | 60 | 2013 |
| Torre de Cristal† | Madrid | 250 m (820 ft) | 45 | 2007 |
| Torre Cepsa | Madrid | 248.3 m (815 ft) | 45 | 2008 |
| Main Tower† | Frankfurt | 240 m (787 ft) | 55 | 1999 |
| Palace of Culture and Science | Warsaw | 237 m (778 ft) | 44 | 1955 |
| Torre PwC | Madrid | 236 m (774 ft) | 52 | 2007 |
| Tour First | Paris | 231 m (758 ft) | 56 | 2010 |
| Unicredit Tower | Milan | 231 m (758 ft) | 35 | 2011 |
| Torre Espacio† | Madrid | 230 m (755 ft) | 57 | 2007 |
| Warsaw Spire | Warsaw | 220 m (722 ft) | 49 | 2016 |
| European Central Bank Headquarters† | Frankfurt | 217.3 m (713 ft) | 45 | 2014 |
| De Zalmhaven I | Rotterdam | 215 m (705 ft) | 58 | 2022 |
| Sky Tower | Wrocław | 212 m (696 ft) | 50 | 2012 |
| Gran Hotel Bali† | Benidorm | 210 m (689 ft) | 52 | 2002 |
| Tour Montparnasse | Paris | 209 m (686 ft) | 59 | 1972 |
| Piedmont Region Headquarters | Turin | 209 m (686 ft) | 42 | 2017 |
| Westendstrasse 1 | Frankfurt | 208 m (682 ft) | 53 | 1993 |
| Warsaw Trade Tower† | Warsaw | 208 m (682 ft) | 43 | 1999 |
| Millennium Tower | Vienna | 202 m (663 ft) | 51 | 1999 |
| Tour Incity† | Lyon | 202 m (663 ft) | 39 | 2015 |
| Warsaw Unit | Warsaw | 200.7 m (658 ft) | 46 | 2021 |
| Tower 185 | Frankfurt | 200 m (656 ft) | 51 | 2011 |
| Intempo† | Benidorm | 200 m (656 ft) | 55 | 2014 |
| Tour Majunga | Paris | 194 m (636 ft) | 45 | 2014 |
| Złota 44 | Warsaw | 192 m (630 ft) | 54 | 2012 |
| Generali Tower† | Milan | 191.5 m (628 ft) | 44 | 2017 |
| Turning Torso | Malmö | 190 m (623 ft) | 54 | 2005 |
| Omniturm | Frankfurt | 189.9 m (623 ft) | 45 | 2019 |
| Grand Tower† | Frankfurt | 187 m (614 ft) | 47 | 2019 |
| Trianon | Frankfurt | 186 m (610 ft) | 45 | 1993 |
| Tour GDF Suez | Paris | 185 m (607 ft) | 37 | 2008 |
| Tour Granite | Paris | 183 m (600 ft) | 35 | 2008 |
| Sevilla Tower | Seville | 180.5 m (592 ft) | 40 | 2016 |
many lower buildings

== Buildings under construction ==
This lists buildings that are under construction in European Union and are planned to rise at least 150 metres (492 ft). Approved or proposed buildings are not included in the table. Included are renders of the finished towers or images of the current construction sites.

Building stopped construction

| Image | Name | City | Metres | Feet | Floors | Planned completion |
|---|---|---|---|---|---|---|
| | Elbtower | Hamburg | 245 | 804 | 64 | On hold |
| | TM Tower | Benidorm | 230 | 755 | 64 | 2028 |
| | Central Business Tower | Frankfurt | 205 | 673 | 52 | 2028 |
| | Sky Fort Business Center | Sofia | 202 | 663 | 52 | 2026 |
| | Riviera Tower | Athens | 198 | 650 | 45 | 2026 |
| | Hard Rock Hotel & Casino | Athens | 197 | 646 | 42 | 2026 |
| | DC-Tower 2 | Vienna | 180 | 590 | 53 | 2026 |
| | Limassol NEO | Limassol | 173 | 568 | 43 | On hold |

== Timeline of the tallest buildings in the EU/EEC ==
The following is a timeline of the tallest buildings in the European Union (EU) and its direct predecessor, the European Economic Community (EEC) established in 1957.

| Name | City | Years as tallest | Metres | Feet | Floors |
|---|---|---|---|---|---|
| Varso Tower | Warsaw | 2021–present | 310 | 1,017 | 53 |
| Commerzbank Tower | Frankfurt | 2020–2021 | 259 | 850 | 56 |
| The Shard | London | 2011–2020 | 306 (Note: Height according to Council on Tall Buildings and Urban Habitat methodology, according to other sources the height is 309.6 m (1,016 ft)) | 1,004 | 73 |
| Commerzbank Tower | Frankfurt | 1997–2011 | 259 | 850 | 56 |
| Messeturm | Frankfurt | 1990–1997 | 257 | 843 | 55 |
| Tour Montparnasse | Paris | 1972–1990 | 210 | 689 | 59 |
| Tour du Midi / Zuidertoren | Brussels | 1966–1972 | 150 | 492 | 38 |
| Pirelli Tower | Milan | 1958–1966 | 127 | 416 | 32 |

Prior to 1966, Edificio España and Torre de Madrid in Madrid surpassed the height of the then tallest EU building, but Spain didn't become a European Union member until 1986. Similarly, before 1990, the Palace of Culture and Science in Warsaw surpassed the height of the then tallest EU building; however, Poland did not become a member of the European Union until 2004.

The Shard ceased to be tallest building in the EU in 2020 due to the United Kingdom exiting the European Union. The title then returned to the previous holder, Frankfurt's Commerzbank Tower. Had this not been the case, the Shard would've still lost the title a few months later to Warsaw's Varso Tower regardless.

== See also ==
- List of tallest buildings in Europe

== Bibliography ==
- Skyscrapers at Emporis
- Skyscrapers at SkyscraperPage
- Skyscrapers at Structurae
