= Varso =

Office complex in Warsaw, Poland

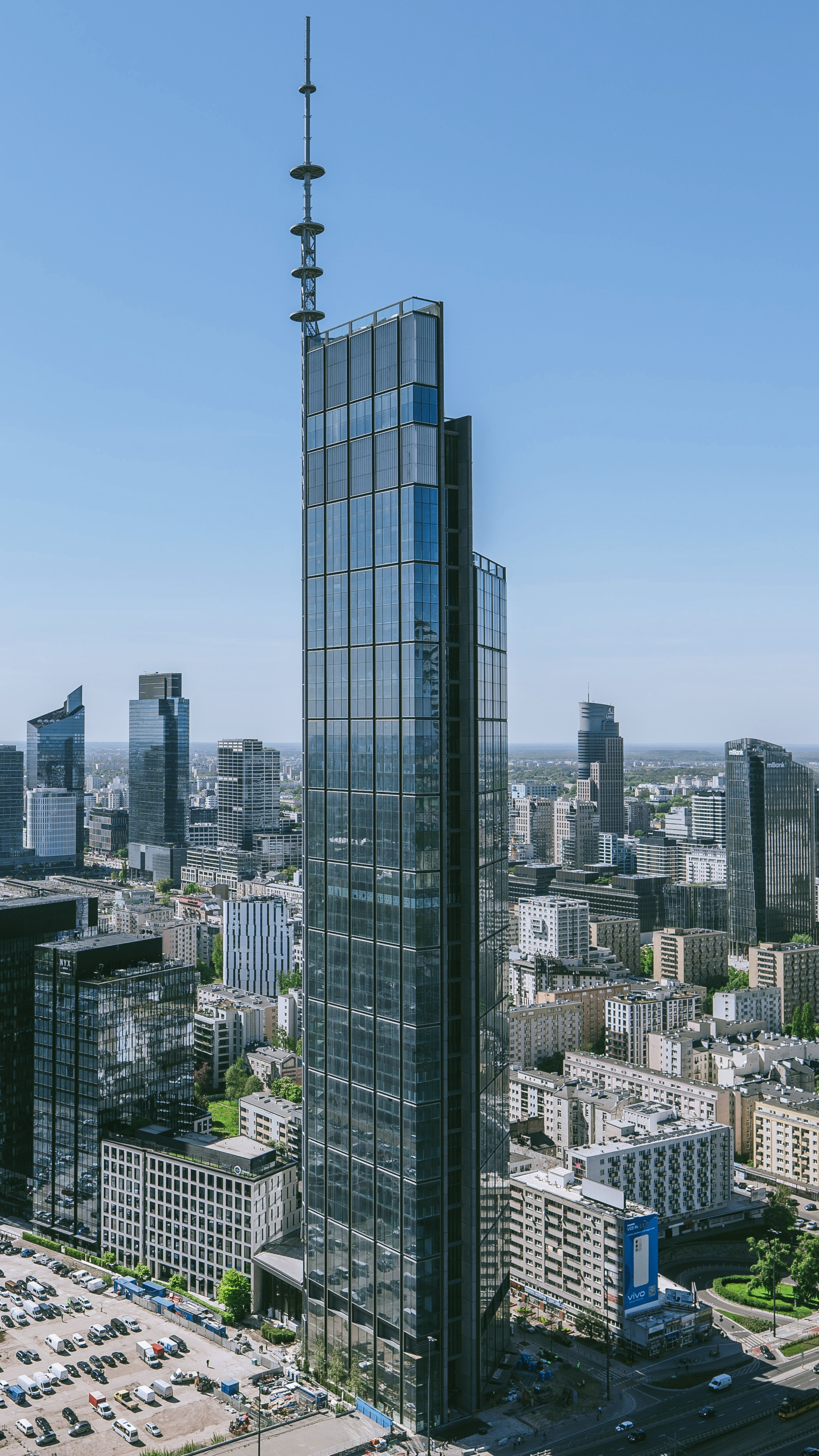
- Varso Tower in May 2022
- Former names: Chmielna Business Center

Record height
- Tallest in European Union since 2021^{[I]}
- Preceded by: Commerzbank Tower

General information
- Type: Office
- Architectural style: Neomodern
- Location: Warsaw, Poland, ul. Chmielna 69/71
- Coordinates: 52°13′43″N 20°59′57″E
- Construction started: December 2016
- Topped-out: February 2021
- Completed: September 2022
- Cost: €500 million

Height
- Architectural: 310 m (1,017 ft)
- Roof: 230 m (755 ft)
- Observatory: 230 m (755 ft)

Technical details
- Floor count: 53
- Floor area: 140,000 m^{2} (1,506,900 sq ft)
- Lifts/elevators: 47

Design and construction
- Architects: Foster + Partners; Epstein Architects (AOR)
- Developer: HB Reavis
- Structural engineer: Buro Happold
- Main contractor: HB Reavis

Website
- varso.com

Varso or Varso Place is a neomodern office complex in Warsaw, Poland. It was designed by Foster + Partners and developed by HB Reavis. The complex features three buildings; the main one, Varso Tower, is the tallest building in Poland, the tallest building in the European Union, and the sixth-tallest building in Europe at 310 metres (1,020 ft) in height. The height to the roof, the highest usable floor, reaches 230 metres (750 ft). It was topped out in February 2021 and completed in September 2022. The observation deck opened in September 2025.

== History ==
=== Design ===
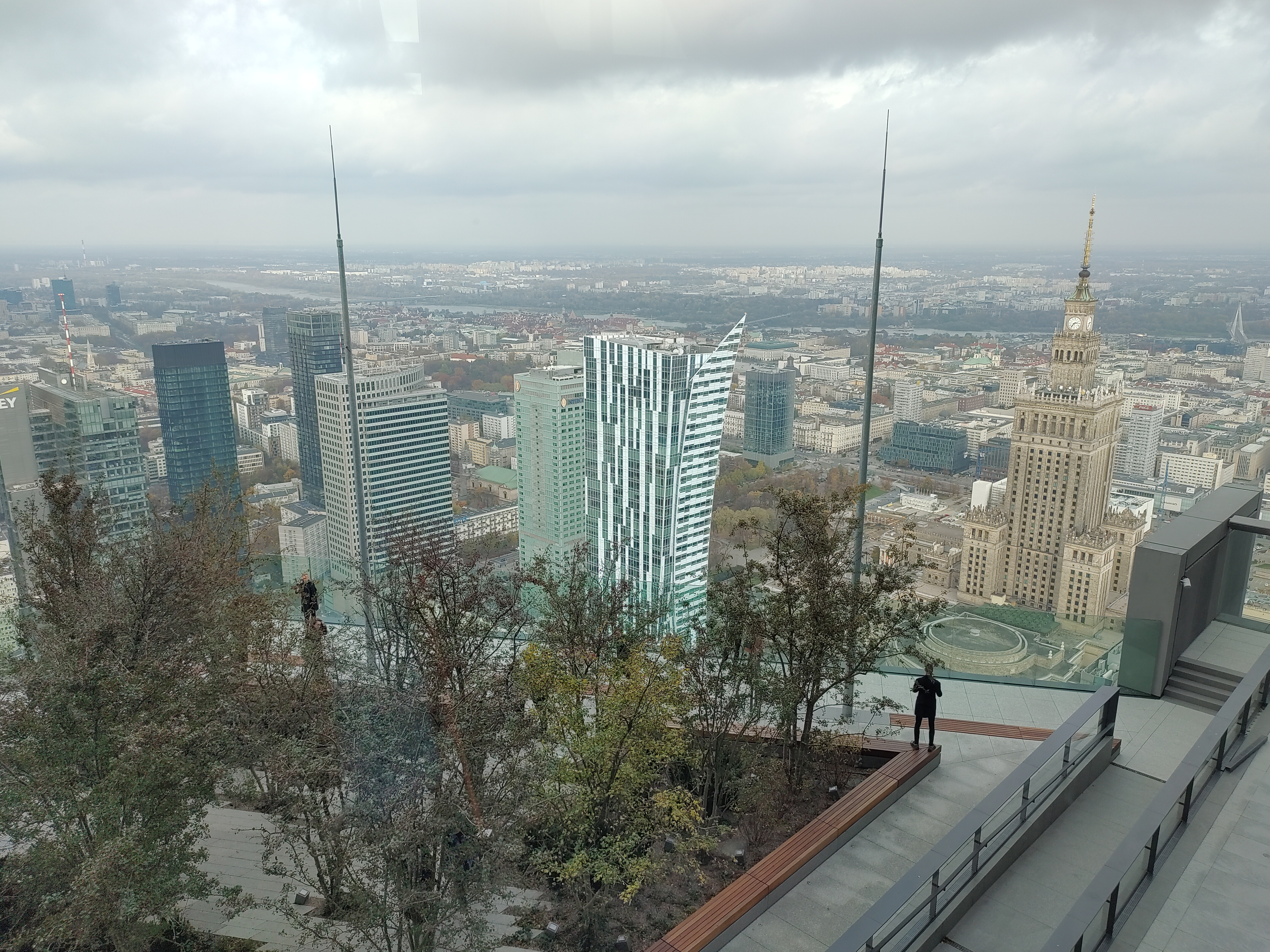
Varso Tower's green (lower) observation deck

Varso Place is located in Wola, on the corner of Chmielna Street and John Paul II Avenue. Construction took place on a plot of 1.72 ha (4.3 acres), purchased in 2011 from PKP by the Slovak company HB Reavis for approximately 171 million złoty.

The estimated cost of construction was approximately €500 million (2.27 billion zł in 2021). Initially, the project was named Chmielna Business Center, being later changed to Varso, which references the Latin name for Warsaw—Varsovia.

The original plan was to build a 130-metre (430 ft) tall skyscraper. The project was later revised and the total height of Varso Tower was increased to 310 m (1,020 ft) including a spire surmounting the building.

Varso Place is a complex of three buildings: a 310 m (1,020 ft) main tower (roof height reaching 230 m (750 ft) with an 80-metre (260 ft) spire on top) and two buildings with a height of 81 and 90 m (266 and 295 ft), respectively called Varso 1 and Varso 2. The total area of Varso Place is 140,000 m^{2} (1,500,000 sq ft), with 10,300 m^{2} (111,000 sq ft) dedicated to commercial services. British-based architecture studio Foster + Partners designed the main tower and HRA Architekci was responsible for designing the Varso 1 and Varso 2 buildings.

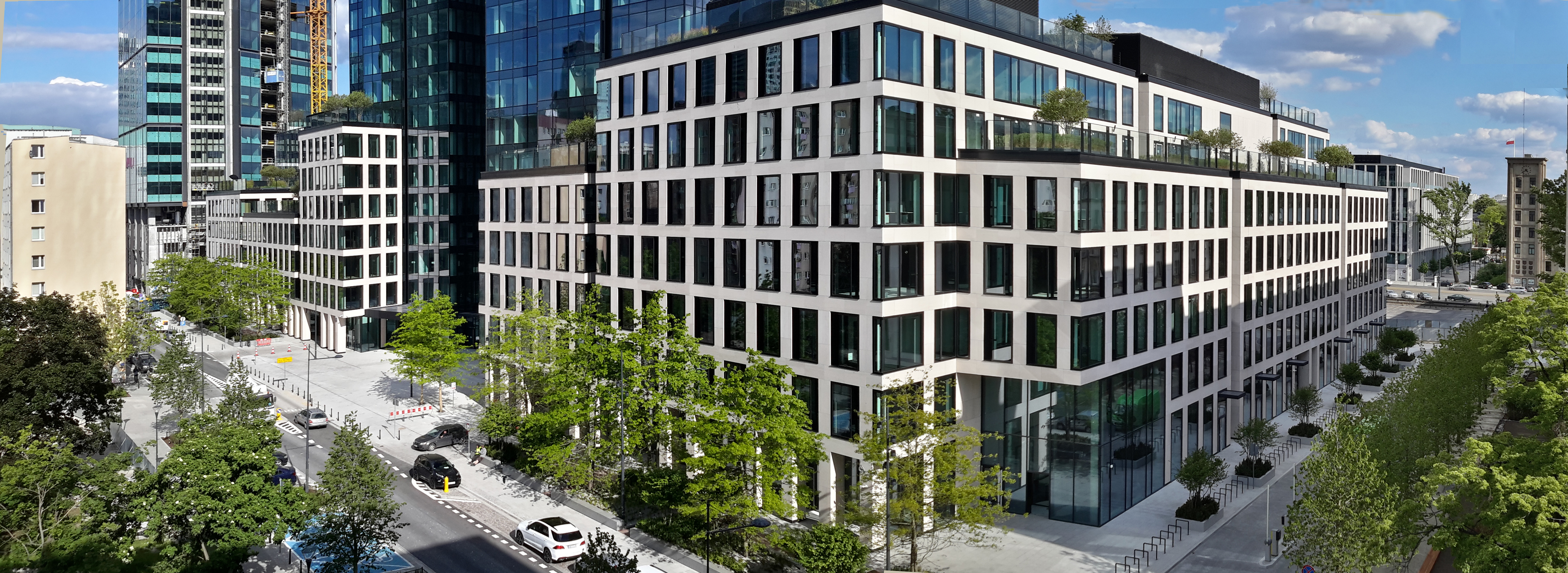
Varso 1 and Varso 2

At a height of 230 m (750 ft) on the main tower, Vista Terrace will become a public observation deck offering panoramic views of the city. A restaurant and a bar called Skytop Restaurant & Bar will occupy the 46th and 49th floors. All three buildings will be connected to each other on the ground floor level and the entire complex will be connected to the Warsaw Central Station.

A four-storey underground car park will accommodate approximately 1,100 cars, 80 motorbikes and 750 bicycles. The modernisation of the surroundings around Chmielna Street is a part of the investment and it will include new pavements, street lamps, benches, bike stands and signage, as well as planting shrubs and trees.

=== Construction ===
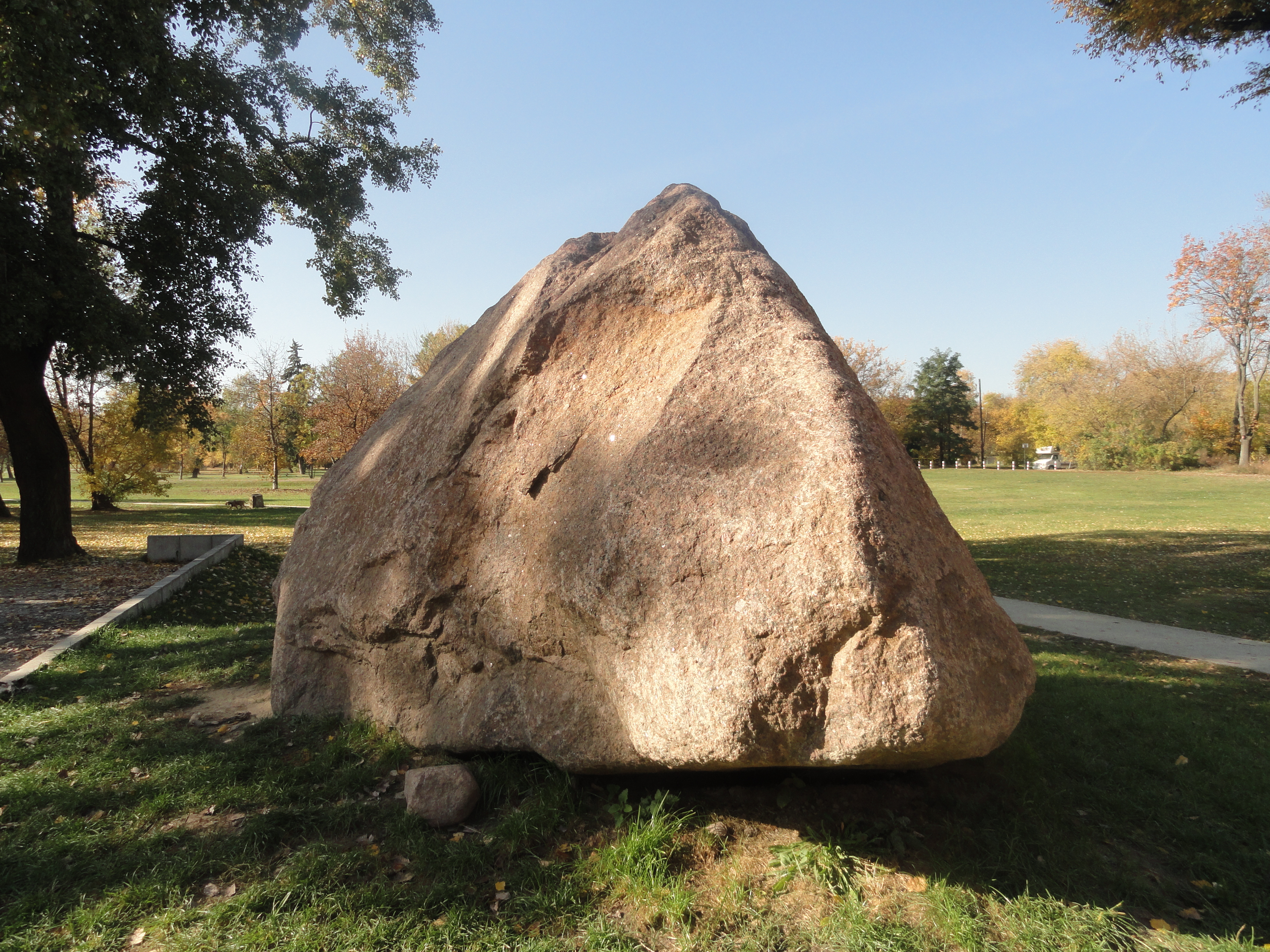
The excavated glacial erratic seen on the Mokotów Field

The general contractor was HB Reavis Construction, a company from the HB Reavis Group. The building permit for Varso was obtained in December 2016, with construction work commencing the same month.

In early 2017, the construction team had to move a transformer that was powering the Warsaw Central Station, as it was located exactly where the Varso Tower would be built. In October 2017, at a depth of 10 m (33 ft), a 60 tonne glacial erratic was excavated at the construction site. It was pulled out using a specialized crane and then transported to Mokotów Field, where it stood next to the National Library. In the future, it will be moved back and displayed next to the entrance of Varso Tower.

On 20 February 2021, the final piece of the spire was lifted to the top of Varso Tower, bringing the skyscraper to its full height of 310 metres (1,017 ft). The tower was completed in September 2022.

Varso Tower became the tallest building in the European Union by surpassing the Commerzbank Tower in Frankfurt, Germany, which previously held the record at 259 m (850 ft).

=== After completion ===
On 9 September 2025, the Highline Warsaw observation deck opened at Varso Tower becoming the highest publicly accessible terrace in the European Union. Located on the building’s 53rd floor at an elevation of 230 metres, it offers a full 360‑degree panorama of Warsaw.

On the night of 21–22 September 2025, a fragment of a window fell from the building’s 11th floor and landed in the café’s outdoor seating area. No one was injured in the incident.

On 31 May 2026, Estonian slackliner Jaan Roose completed a 500-meter walk from the Palace of Culture and Science to the 43rd-floor terrace of Varso Tower suspended on a line at the height of 180 meters. The walk lasted 30 minutes and was part of an event organized by Red Bull.

== Radio broadcast ==
The Varso Tower, which is currently part of the city's emissions complex, houses a transmitter from which radio stations are broadcast. The first broadcasting tests were conducted between 25 and 28 July 2023, when Radio SuperNova (currently Eska2) and Radio VOX FM were broadcast. The same stations were broadcast during the second phase of testing, which lasted from 24 August to 24 October 2023. In the first half of 2025, the stations of Polish Radio (Program I, II, III and IV), Radio Time Group (Radio Eska Warszawa, Eska Rock, VOX FM, Eska2) and RMF Group (RMF Classic) officially began broadcasting the signal from Varso.

== Gallery ==
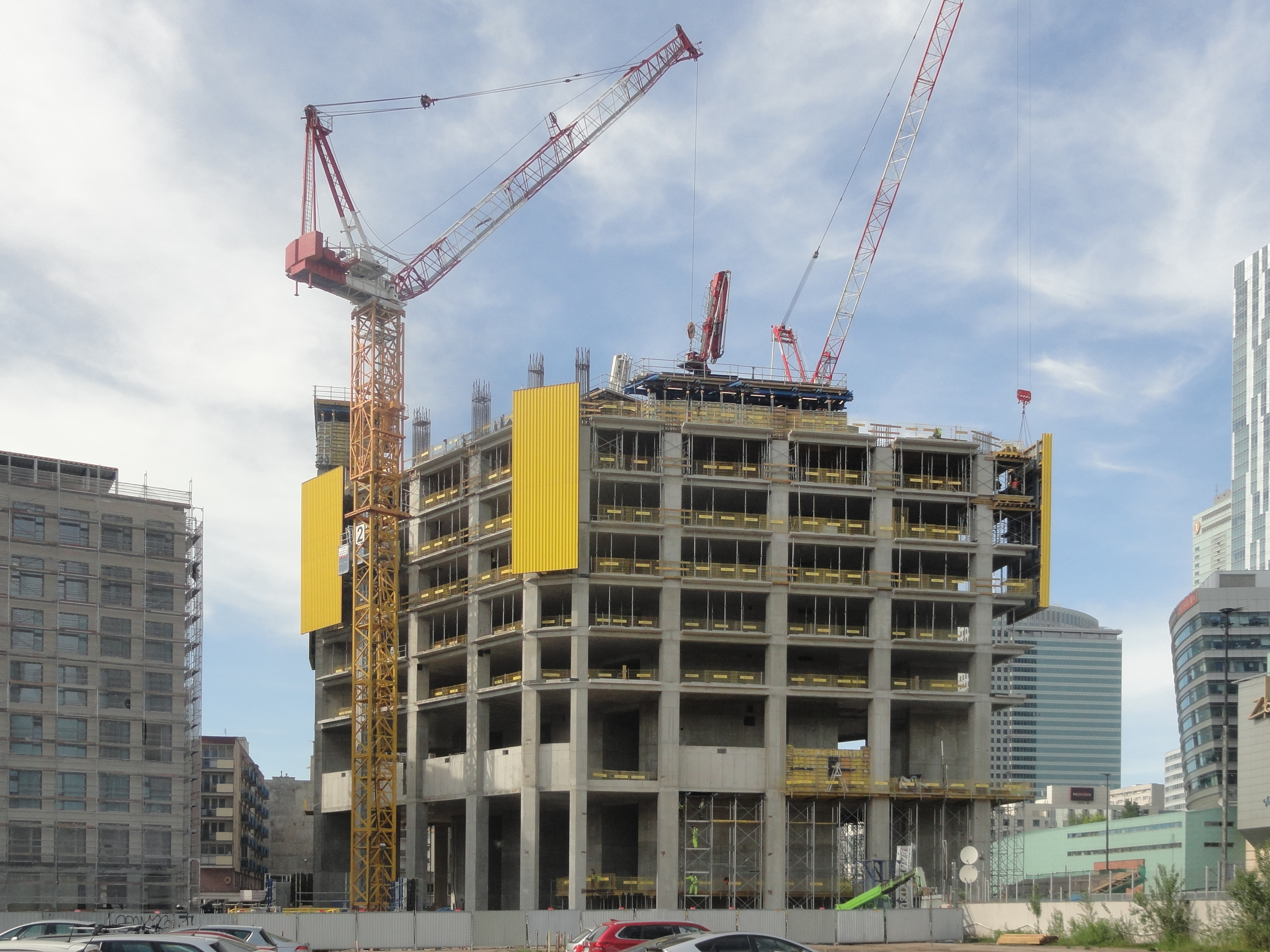
May 2019

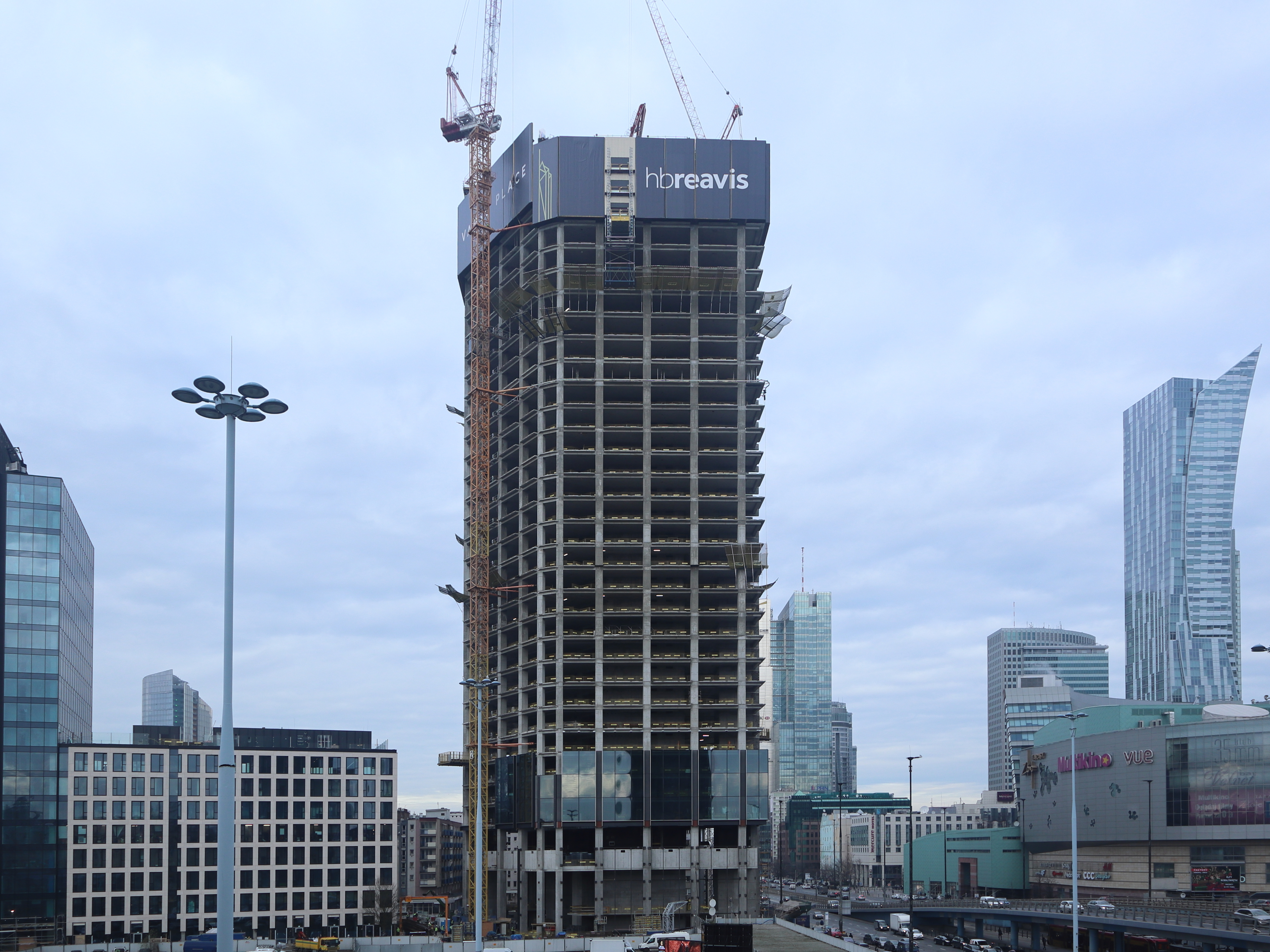
December 2019

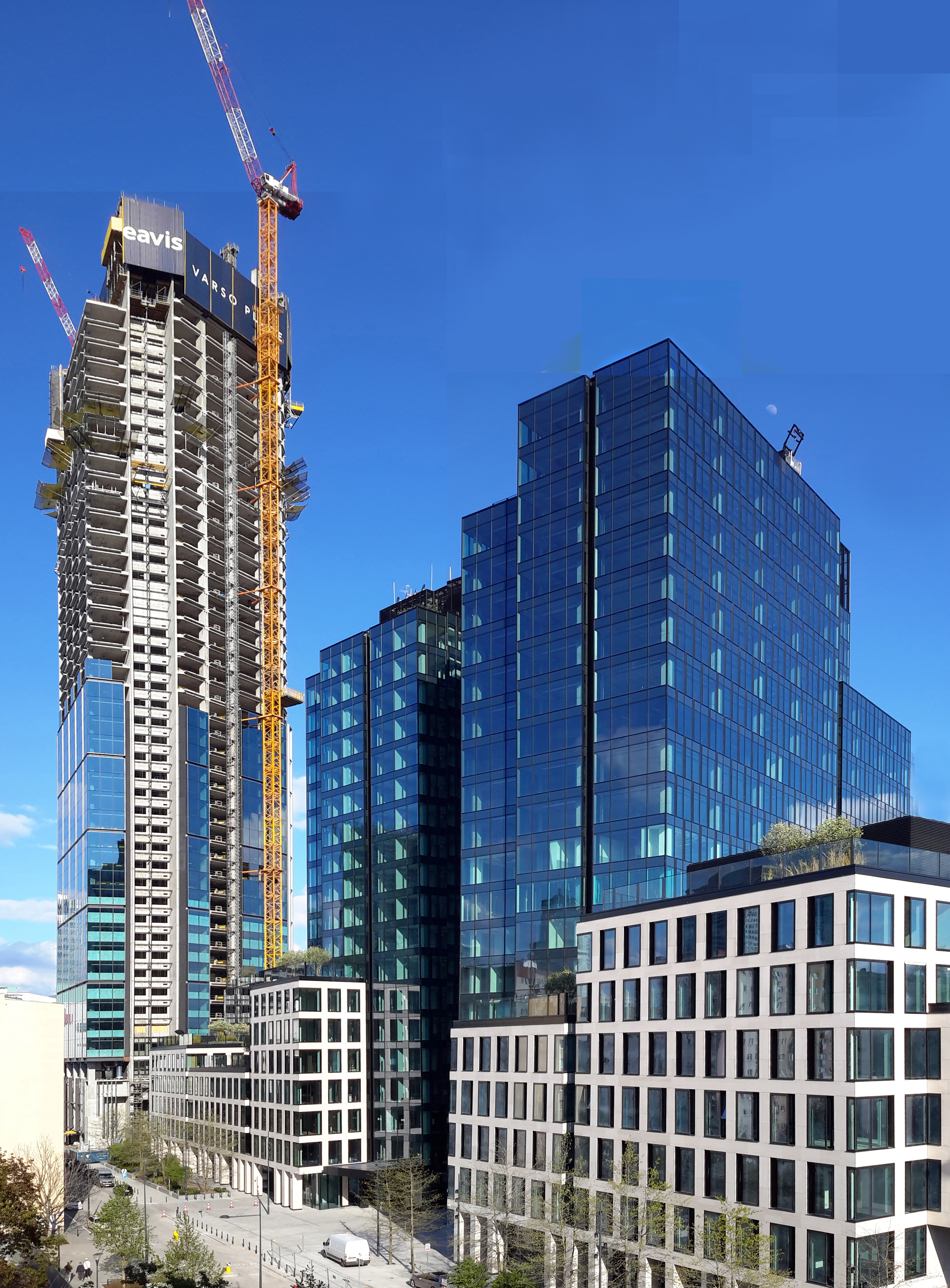
May 2020

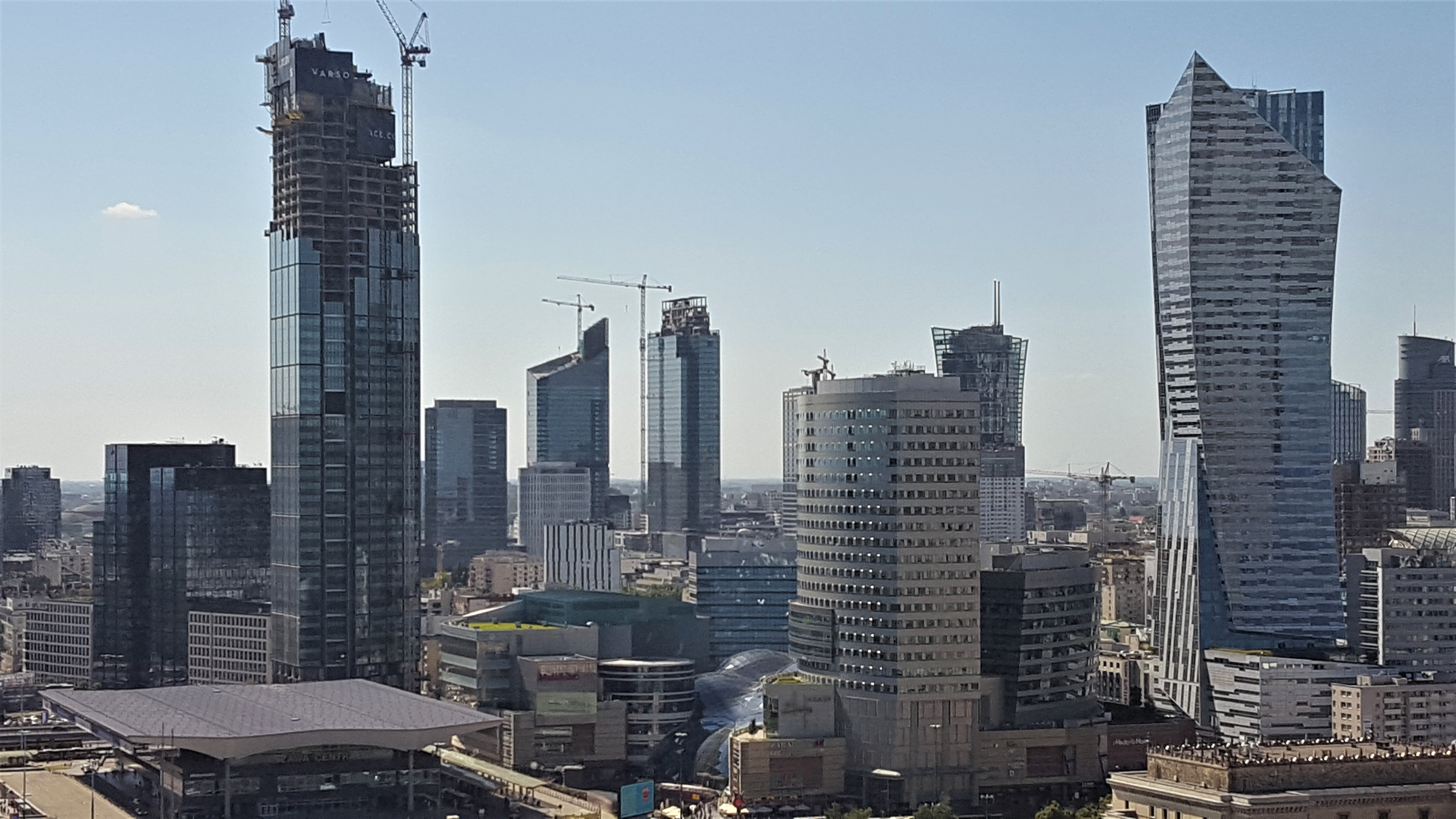
July 2020

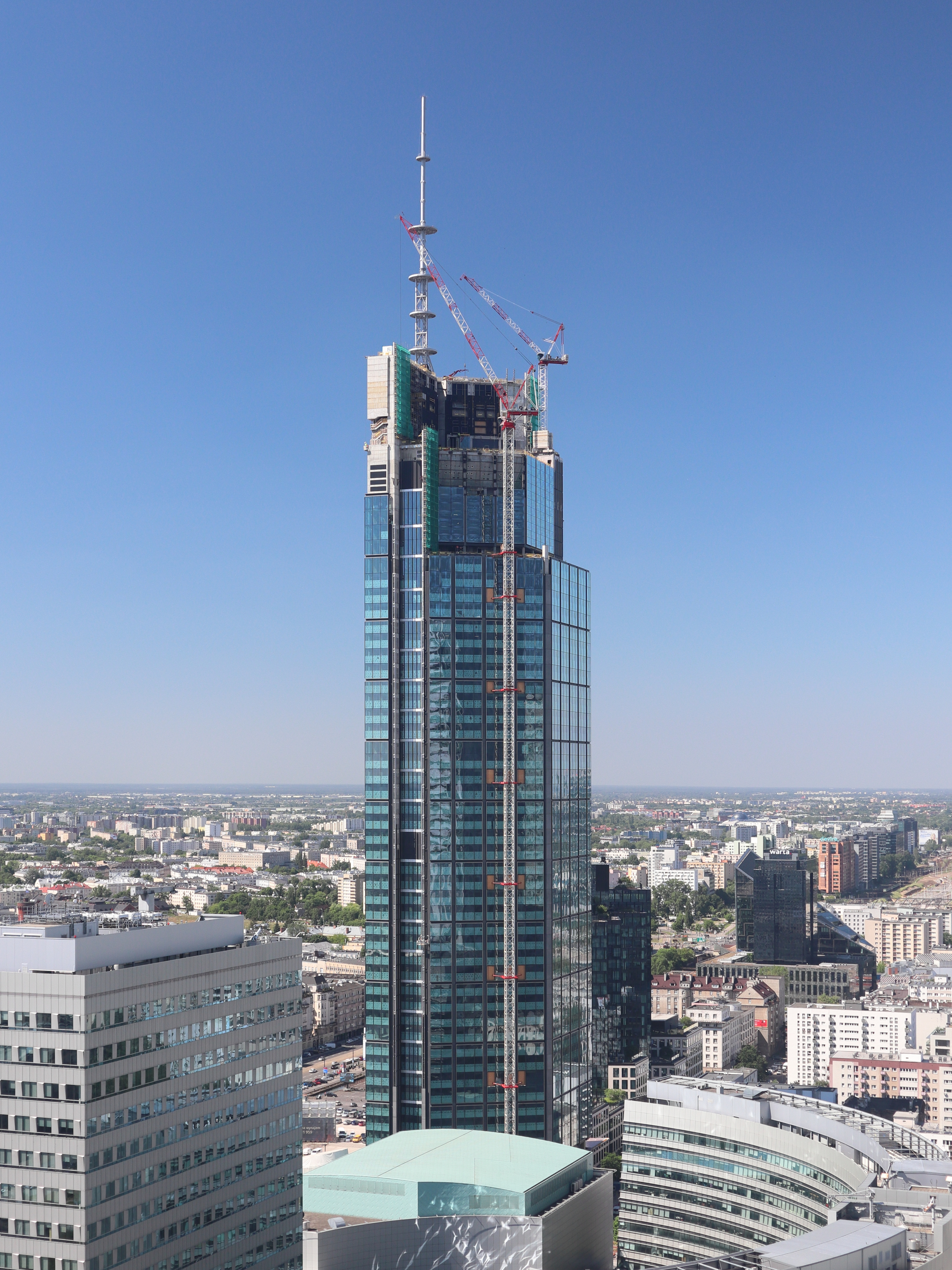
June 2021

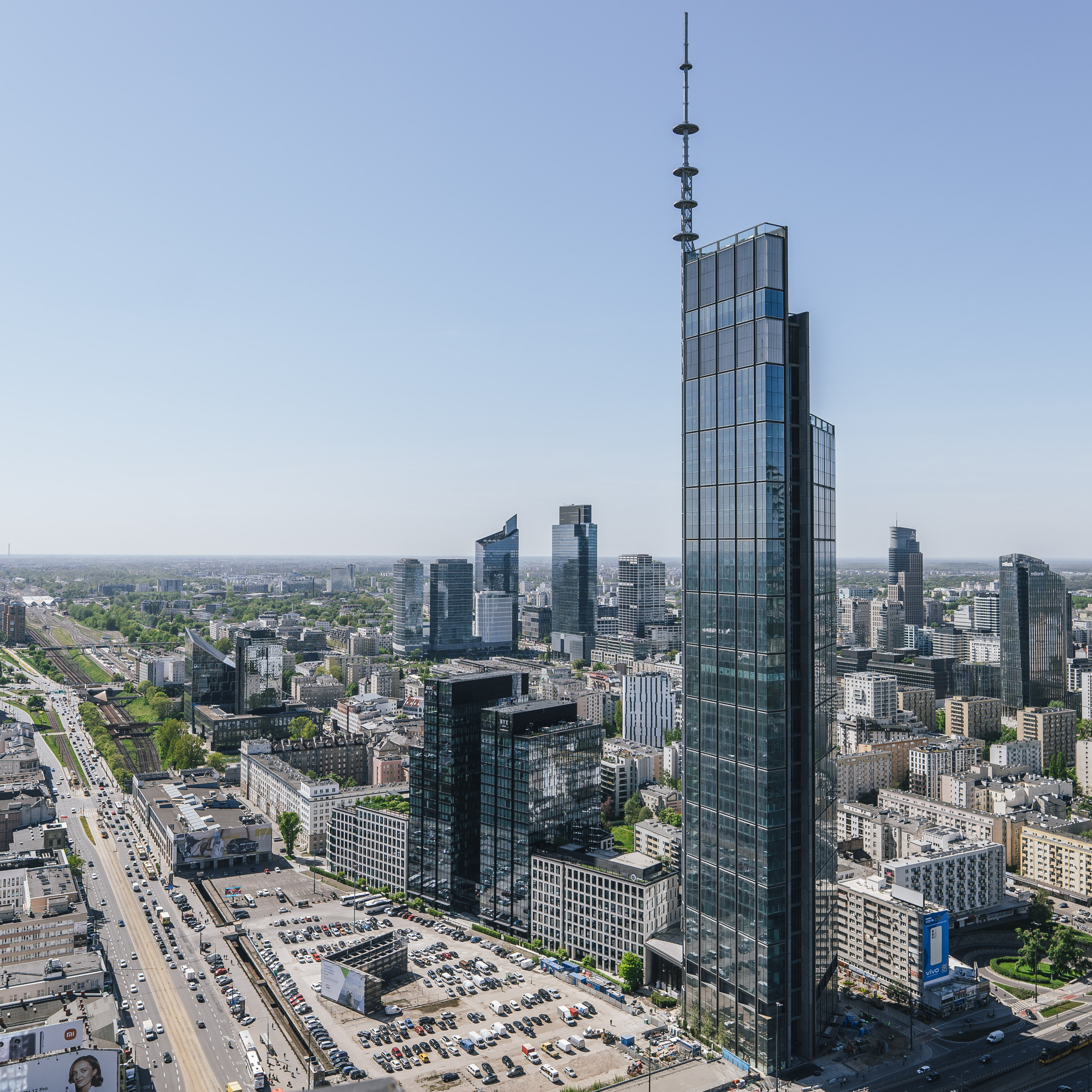
May 2022

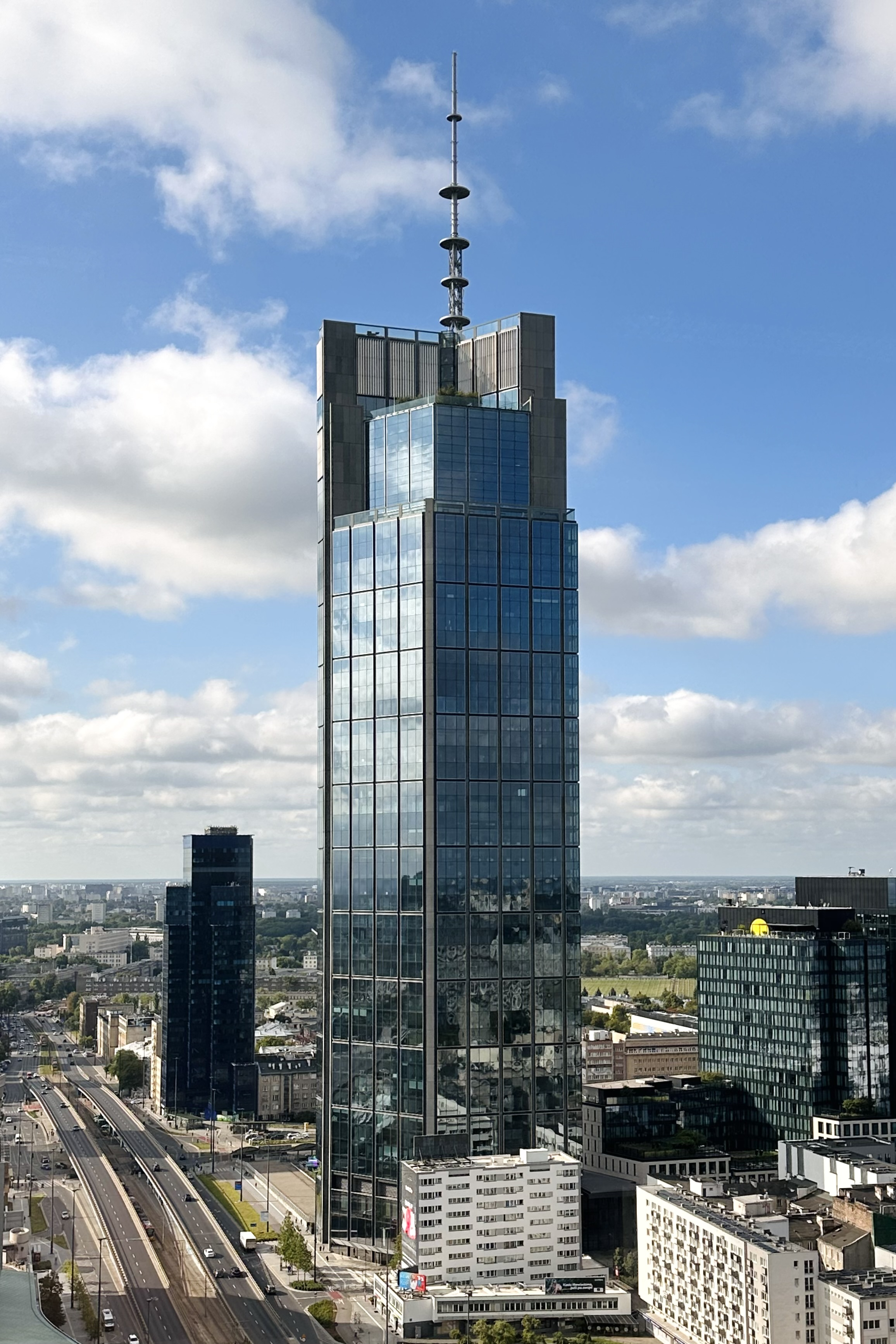
July 2024 (seen from Rondo 1)

== See also ==
- List of tallest buildings in Poland
- List of tallest buildings in Warsaw
- List of tallest buildings in Europe

Records
Preceded by Palace of Culture and Science	Tallest building in Poland; 2021–present 310 metres (1,020 ft)	Current holder
Preceded by Commerzbank Tower	Tallest building in the European Union; 2021–present 310 metres (1,020 ft)	Current holder
