= Opernturm =

43-storey 170 m (560 ft) skyscraper in the Westend-Süd district of Frankfurt, Germany

OpernTurm
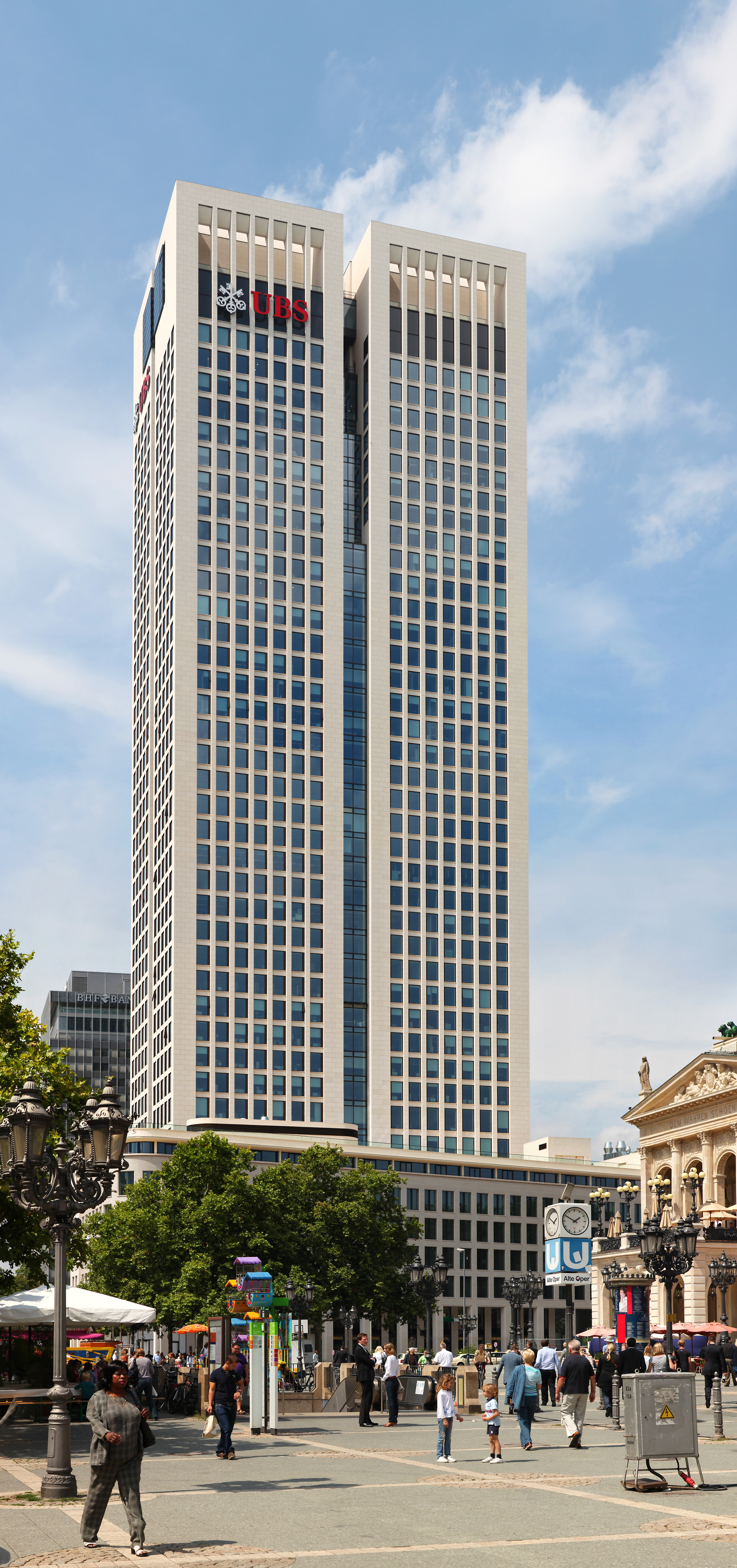
- Interactive map of the OpernTurm area

General information
- Type: Commercial offices
- Location: Bockenheimer Landstraße 2-4; Frankfurt; Hesse, Germany
- Coordinates: 50.116°N 8.670°E
- Opening: March 2007–2009

Height
- Roof: 170 m (560 ft)

Technical details
- Floor count: 43; 3 below ground
- Floor area: 62,500 m^{2} (673,000 sq ft)
- Lifts/elevators: 16

Design and construction
- Architects: Christoph Mäckler; MOW Architekten Olschok Westenberger + Partner
- Developer: Tishman Speyer Properties
- Structural engineer: Bollinger + Grohmann

OpernTurm (Opera Tower) is a 43-storey 170 m (560 ft) skyscraper in the Westend-Süd district of Frankfurt, Germany. The property is situated opposite Alte Oper on the corner of Bockenheimer Landstraße and Bockenheimer Anlage. The building was designed by Christoph Mäckler. The project developer was Tishman Speyer, a US firm that previously built the Sony Center in Berlin and the Messeturm in Frankfurt.

== Design ==
The Opernturm consists of a 42-storey, 170 m (560 ft) tower, a 7-storey, 26 m (85 ft) podium building facing towards Alte Oper. Access is through an 18 m (59 ft) high lobby. The yellow-beige stone cladding of the facades was designed to fit in with the existing buildings surrounding Opernplatz. Designed to consume 23 percent less energy than stipulated by Germany's 2007 EnEV Energy Regulation, the Opernturm was one of the first office buildings in Europe to be certified to the Leadership in Energy and Environmental Design (LEED) Gold standard.

The site was occupied by one of Frankfurt's first high-rise buildings, the 68 m (223 ft) Zürich-Haus built in 1962. In 1998 the owner of the building, Zürich Versicherung, commissioned Christoph Mäckler's firm to design a new building that would be 22 m (72 ft) taller in order to maximize land use. When the initially proposed building was felt to be rather bulky, Zürich Versicherung suggested to the local government to build the new tower up to a height of 160 m (520 ft) and to compensate for the added height by making available company-owned land to extend the adjacent Rothschildpark down to Bockenheimer Landstrasse. The local government eventually agreed but Zürich Versicherung did not go ahead with the development and sold the empty site - the old tower was demolished in 2002 - to project developer Tishman Speyer in July 2004.

Civil engineering works started in late 2006 with the removal of the former underground garage of Zürich-Haus. The groundbreaking for the development of OpernTurm took place on 22 January 2007.

The completion of Opernturm in late 2009 added another landmark to the city's much photographed skyline, with its elegant silhouette and the natural stone façade setting it apart from the glass towers dominating the cityscape. The adjoining Rothschildpark has been extended by 5,500 m^{2} (59,000 sq ft) and redesigned in the style of an English garden.

== Tenants ==
In November 2009, the retailer Manufactum was the first tenant to move into the podium building. The building's anchor tenant, occupying 31,000 m^{2} (330,000 sq ft), is the European headquarters offices of the UBS Group AG.

Leading multinational legal services Allen & Overy, Ashurst, Morgan, Lewis & Bockius and Reed Smith LLP and the world's largest asset manager BlackRock are occupying several floors of the tower.

== See also ==
- List of tallest buildings in Frankfurt
- List of tallest buildings in Germany
- List of tallest buildings in Europe
