= List of Frankfurt U-Bahn stations =

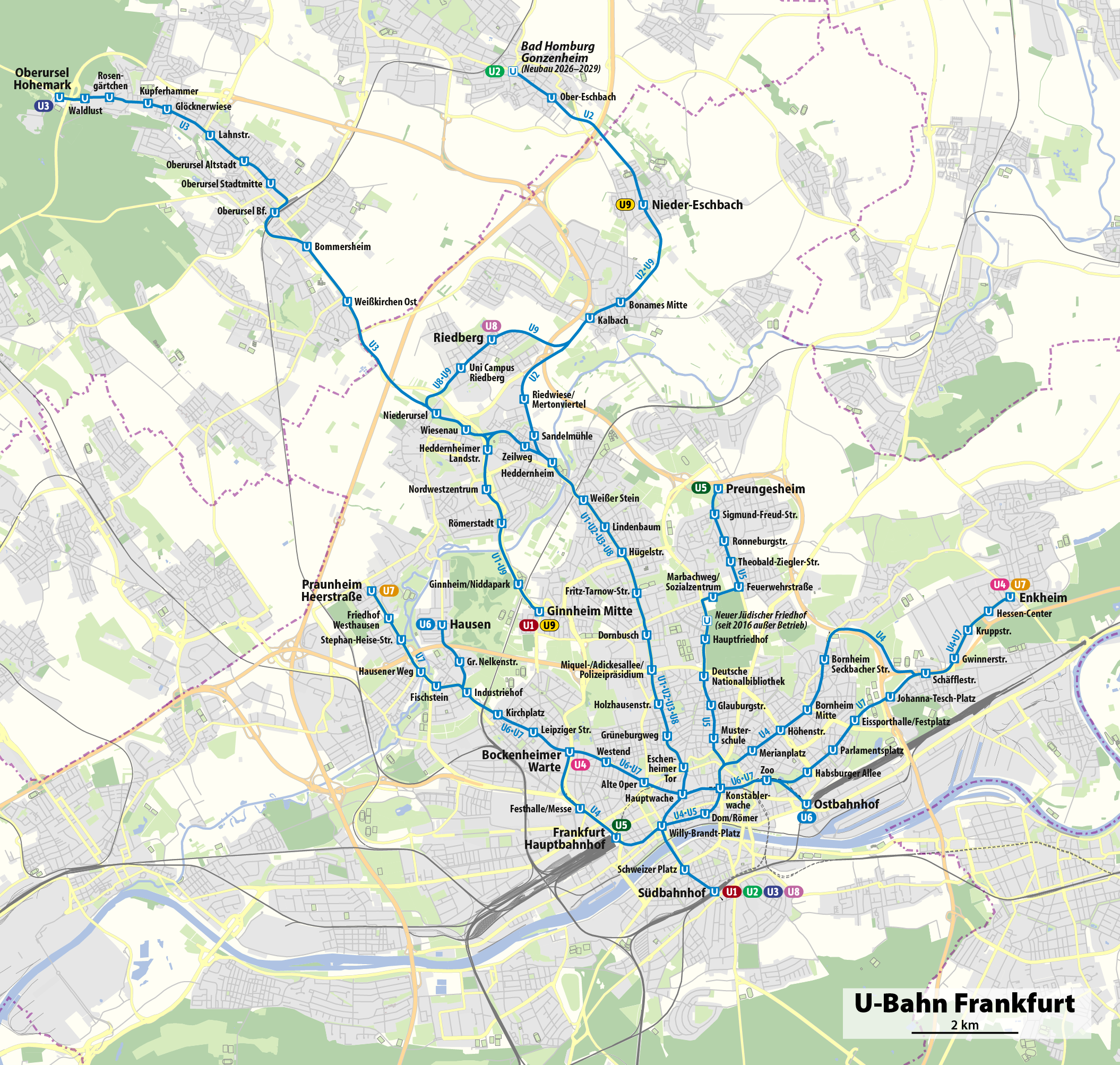
System map of Frankfurt U-Bahn network (2011)

The following list is of all 86 stations on the Frankfurt U-Bahn. The Frankfurt U-Bahn network consists of nine lines operating on 64.85 kilometres (40.3 mi) of route.

== Legend ==
- Boldface: Terminus station

== List ==
Station	Route	Lines	Opened	Character	Notes
Alte Oper	C	U6 U7	11 October 1986	Underground	
**Bockenheimer Warte**	C/D	U4 U6 U7	11 October 1986	Underground	D-route portion of station opened 20 February 2001; Western terminus of the line Connection between the C- and D- routes
Bommersheim	A	U3	27 May 1978	At-grade	
Bonames Mitte	A	U2 U9	18 December 1971	At-grade	
Bornheim Mitte	B	U4	31 May 1980	Underground	Two single-track stations, one above the other
Deutsche Nationalbibliothek	B	U5	26 May 1974	At-grade	Formerly called Adickesallee/Nibelungenallee (until 1997) and Nibelungenallee/Deutsche Bibliothek (1997–2007)
Dom/Römer	B	U4 U5	26 May 1974	Underground	Formerly called Römer (until 2002)
Dornbusch	A	U1 U2 U3 U8	4 October 1968	At-grade	
Eckenheimer Landstraße/Marbachweg	B	U5	24 May 1974	At-grade	
Eissporthalle/Festplatz	C	U7	30 May 1992	Underground	
**Enkheim**	C	U4 U7	30 May 1992	At-grade	Eastern terminus of & lines
Eschenheimer Tor	A	U1 U2 U3 U8	4 October 1968	Underground	
Festhalle/Messe	D	U4	10 February 2001	Underground	
Fischstein	C	U6	11 October 1986	At-grade	Station is in the median of the street
Friedhof Westhausen	C	U6	11 October 1986	At-grade	Station is in the median of the street
Fritz-Tarnow-Straße	A	U1 U2 U3 U8	4 October 1968	Underground	
Gießener Straße	B	U5	26 May 1974	At-grade	U5 line terminus from 1974–78; Rebuilt with high platforms in 2013
**Ginnheim**	A(/D)	U1 U9	27 May 1978	At-grade	Terminus of line, and southern terminus of line
Glauburgstraße	B	U5	26 May 1974	At-grade	
Glöcknerwiese	A	U3	27 May 1978	At-grade	
**Gonzenheim**	A	U2	18 December 1971	At-grade	Northern terminus of line in Bad Homburg
Große Nelkenstraße	C	U7	11 October 1986	At-grade	Station is in the median of the street
Grüneburgweg	A	U1 U2 U3 U8	4 October 1968	Underground	
Gwinnerstraße	C	U4 U7	30 May 1992	At-grade	Former tram station
Habsburgerallee	C	U6 U7	30 May 1992	At-grade	
Hauptbahnhof	B/D	U4 U5	28 May 1978	Underground	Planned southern terminus for the D-route
Hauptfriedhof	B	U5	26 May 1974	At-grade	Main cemetery of Frankfurt (opened in 1828) is nearby
Hauptwache	A/C	U1 U2 U3 U6 U7 U8	4 October 1968	Underground	Southern terminus of the first Frankfurt underground line C-route portion of station opened 11 October 1986
**Hausen**	C	U7	11 October 1986	At-grade	Western terminus of line Station is in the median of the street
Hausener Weg	C	U6	11 October 1986	At-grade	Station is in the median of the street
Heddernheim	A	U1 U2 U3 U8	4 October 1968	At-grade	Location of Heddernheim depot
Heddernheimer Landstraße	A(/D)	U1 U9	4 October 1968	At-grade	Just beyond the northern entrance of the Nordweststadt tunnel
**Heerstraße**	C	U6	11 October 1986	At-grade	Western terminus of line in Praunheim; Connects to the light rail central depot
Hessen-Center	C	U4 U7	30 May 1992	At-grade	Connects to the shopping center of the same name
**Hohemark**	A	U3	27 May 1978	At-grade	Northern terminus of line in Oberursel; Highest elevation in the Frankfurt U-Bahn system Potential starting point for hiking in Taunus
Höhenstraße	B	U4	31 May 1980	Underground	Two single-track stations, one above the other
Holzhausenstraße	A	U1 U2 U3 U8	4 October 1968	Underground	
Hügelstraße	A	U1 U2 U3 U8	4 October 1968	At-grade	
Industriehof	C	U6 U7	11 October 1986	At-grade	Station just west of the C-tunnel opening U6 and U7 lines branch off to the west of station Station called Industriehof/Neue Börse until 11 December 2010
Johanna-Tesch-Platz	C	U7	30 May 1992	At-grade	Connects to the east depot
Kalbach	A	U2 U9	18 December 1971	At-grade	
Kirchplatz	C	U6 U7	11 October 1986	Underground	
Konstablerwache	B/C	U4 U5 U6 U7	26 May 1974	Underground	C-route portion of station opened 11 October 1986
Kruppstraße	C	U4 U7	30 May 1992	At-grade	
Kupferhammer	A	U3	27 May 1978	At-grade	
Lahnstraße	A	U3	27 May 1978	At-grade	
Leipziger Straße	C	U6 U7	11 October 1986	Underground	Two single-track stations, one above the other
Lindenbaum	A	U1 U2 U3 U8	4 October 1968	At-grade	
Marbachweg/Sozialzentrum	B	U5	26 May 1974	At-grade	Rebuilt with high platforms in 2013
Merianplatz	B	U4	31 May 1980	Underground	Two single-track stations, one above the other
Miquel-/Adickesallee /Polizeipräsidium	A	U1 U2 U3 U8	4 October 1968	Underground	
Musterschule	B	U5	26 May 1974	At-grade	
Neuer jüdischer Friedhof	B	U5	26 May 1974	At-grade	Formerly called Versorgungsamt (until 12 December 2009) and Prieststraße (from 2009 until 10 December 2011)
Niddapark	A	U1 U9	1989	Elevated	Built for Federal Garden Exhibition of 1989
**Nieder-Eschbach**	A	U2 U9	18 December 1971	At-grade	Northern terminus of the line (and some trains)
Niederursel	A(/D)	U3 U8 U9	27 May 1978	At-grade	
Nordwestzentrum	A(/D)	U1 U9	4 October 1968	Underground	Formerly Nordweststadt
Ober-Eschbach	A	U2 U9	18 December 1971	At-grade	
Oberursel Altstadt	A	U3	27 May 1978	At-grade	Formerly called Portstraße (until 13 December 2008)
Oberursel Bahnhof	A	U3	27 May 1978	At-grade	
Oberursel Stadtmitte	A	U3	27 May 1978	At-grade	Formerly Liebfrauenstraße
Ostbahnhof	C	U6	29 May 1999	Underground	
Parlamentsplatz	C	U7	30 May 1992	Underground	
**Preungesheim**	A	U5	28 May 1978	At-grade	Northern terminus of the line
**Riedberg**	D	U8 U9	12 December 2010	At-grade	Northern terminus of the line
Riedwiese/Mertonviertel	A	U2	18 December 1971	At-grade	
Ronneburgstraße	B	U5	28 May 1978	At-grade	Rebuilt with high platforms in 2013
Römerstadt	A(/D)	U1 U9	29 September 1974	In trench	Station in highway median
Rosengärtchen	A	U3	1 June 1997	At-grade	
Sandelmühle	A	U2	18 December 1971	At-grade	
Schäfflestraße	C	U4 U7	30 May 1992	At-grade	Terminus of individual U4 trains from 15 June to 13 December 2008
Schweizer Platz	A	U1 U2 U3 U8	29 September 1984	Underground	
Seckbacher Landstraße	B	U4	31 May 1980	Underground	Connecting tunnel to the east depot; partial terminus of U4
Sigmund-Freud-Straße	B	U5	28 May 1978	Elevated	Rebuilt with high platforms in 2013
Stephan-Heise-Straße	C	U6	11 October 1986	At-grade	Station is in the median of the street
**Südbahnhof**	A	U1 U2 U3 U8	29 September 1984	Underground	
Theobald-Ziegler-Straße	B	U5	28 May 1978	Elevated	Rebuilt with high platforms in 2013
Uni-Campus Riedberg	D	U8 U9	12 December 2010	At-grade	
Waldlust	A	U3	27 May 1978	At-grade	Stop on single-track section
Weißer Stein	A	U1 U2 U3 U8	4 October 1968	Underground	
Weißkirchen Ost	A	U3	18 December 1971	At-grade	
Westend	C	U6 U7	11 October 1986	Underground	Metro station at the former residence of Wilhelm Busch (1867–72) and at the former headquarters of Metallgesellschaft (Bockenheimer Landstraße 62 and 77)
Wiesenau	A(/D)	U3 U8 U9	27 May 1978	At-grade	
Willy-Brandt-Platz	A/B	U1 U2 U3 U4 U5 U8	4 November 1973	Underground	Formerly called Theaterplatz until 1992; B-route portion of station opened 26 May 1974
Zeilweg	A	U1 U3 U8	4 October 1968	Underground	Station on a former railway line With barrier-secured transition
Zoo	C	U6 U7	11 October 1986	Underground	Near Frankfurt Zoological Garden
