= Tour Michelet =

Office skyscraper in La Défense, France

- Interactive map of the Tour Michelet area

General information
- Type: Office
- Architectural style: Modern
- Location: 24 Cours Michelet, La Défense, Paris
- Coordinates: 48°53′18″N 2°14′43″E
- Completed: 1985

Height
- Roof: 127 m (417 ft)

Technical details
- Floor count: 34
- Floor area: 77,750 m^{2} (837,000 sq ft)

Design and construction
- Architects: Jean Willerval, Henri La Fonta & Branco Vulic

Website
- Official website

Tour Michelet (formerly known as Tour Total or PB17) is an office skyscraper in the Puteaux commune of the La Défense district in Paris. Built in 1985, the tower stands at 127 m (417 ft) tall with 34 floors and is the 34th tallest building in Paris.

== History ==
Designed by architects Jean Willerval, Henri La Fonta, and Branco Vulic, the tower notably serves as the headquarters of the French company of TotalEnergies, whose previous headquarters were until its relocation to the Total Coupole Tower (Tour Total in the present) in 2000 following the acquisition of Elf Aquitaine. From its inception in 1985, it was the headquarters of Kodak Pathé. The tower is connected to the public transport network in the greater Paris area via the La Défense metro station and the La Défense train station.

Like several other buildings in La Défense such as (Tour Franklin, Cœur Défense, the former Elf building and Tour Les Poissons, the Michelet Tower's volumetry creates the effect of being composed of several joined buildings, an impression accentuated by the various patterns on the facade, sometimes striped, sometimes gridded.

The tower was planned to be demolished in 2020 in order to make place for The Link Towers, but the solution was scrapped in time.

== See also ==
- List of tallest buildings in France
- List of tallest buildings and structures in the Paris region
