= Tour Granite =

Office skyscraper in La Défense, the high-rise business district in Paris, France

- Interactive map of the Tour Granite area

General information
- Status: Completed
- Type: Office
- Location: La Défense (Nanterre)
- Coordinates: 48°53′30.47″N 2°13′46.52″E
- Completed: 2008

Height
- Antenna spire: 183 m (600 ft)
- Roof: 183 m (600 ft)

Technical details
- Floor count: 35
- Floor area: 67,740 m^{2} (729,100 sq ft)
- Lifts/elevators: 15

Design and construction
- Architect: Christian de Portzamparc

Website
- www.christiandeportzamparc.com/en/projects/granite-tower/

Tour Granite (French pronunciation: [tuʁ ɡʁanit]) is an office skyscraper in La Défense, the high-rise business district situated west of Paris, France.

Tour Granite was opened in December 2008. The building is designed by French architect Christian de Portzamparc. It is the fifth tallest building in la Défense, after Tour First, Tour Total, Tour Areva and Tour T1.

Tour Granite was ordered by the Société Générale banking group. It was built as a complement to the Société Générale twin towers whose office space was insufficient for the needs of the group. Like the existing two towers, Tour Granite has a sharply inclined roof.

== See also ==
Ground-level view of Tour Granite

- List of tallest structures in Paris
