= Tour Sequoia =

- Tour Sequoia, July 2015
- Interactive map of the Tour Sequoia area

General information
- Type: Office
- Location: La Défense (Puteaux)
- Coordinates: 48°53′38.5″N 2°14′24″E
- Construction started: 1989
- Completed: 1990

Height
- Antenna spire: 119 m (390 ft)
- Roof: 119 m (390 ft)

Technical details
- Floor count: 33
- Floor area: 55,000 m^{2} (590,000 sq ft)

Design and construction
- Architects: Nicolas Ayoub, Michel Andrault, Pierre Parat

Website
- parisladefense.com/en/discover/towers/sequoia

Tour Sequoia (previously known as tour Bull, and also known as tour SFR or tour Cegetel) is an office skyscraper located in La Défense business district just west of Paris, France.

Built in 1990, the 119-metre-tall tower represents the transition between the third and the fourth generations of buildings in La Défense. It is the first tower to be built with a semi-circular design in the business district. The design later inspired other towers such as CBC, Kupka, Pacific, Société Générale twin towers, and Tour CBX. Tour Sequoia has been built in proximity with the CNIT and the Grande Arche.

== See also ==
- Skyscraper
- La Défense
- List of tallest structures in Paris
