= List of tallest buildings in the Paris region =

Tall buildings in the Paris region
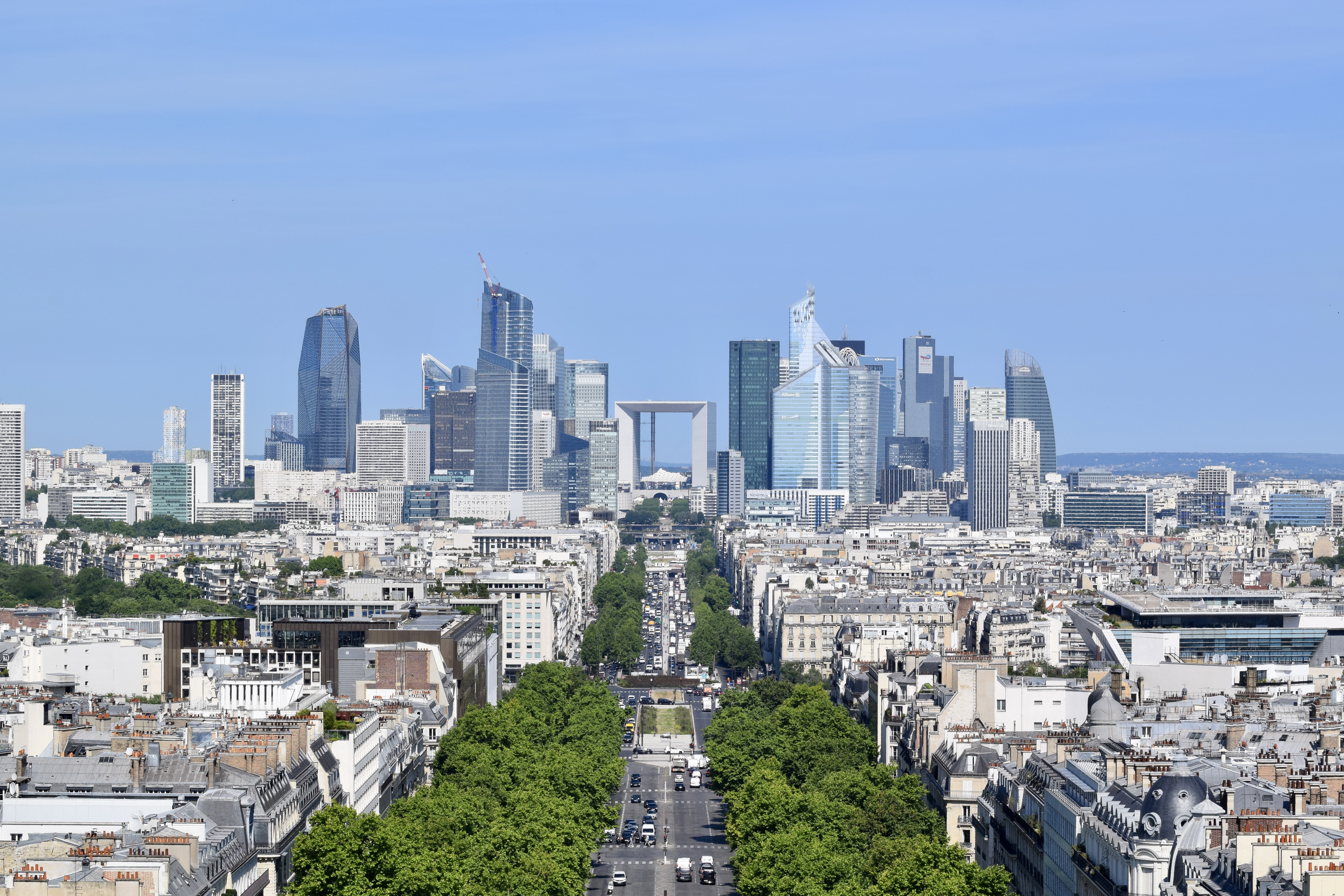
- Skyline of La Défense in 2025
- Tallest building: The Link (2025)
- Tallest building height: 242 m (794 ft)
- Tallest structure: Eiffel Tower (1889)
- Tallest structure height: 330 m (1,083 ft)
- Major clusters: La Défense; 13th arrondissement Front de Seine
- First 150 m+ building: Tour Les Poissons (1970)

Number of tall buildings (2026)
- Taller than 100 m (328 ft): 85
- Taller than 150 m (492 ft): 24
- Taller than 200 m (656 ft): 4

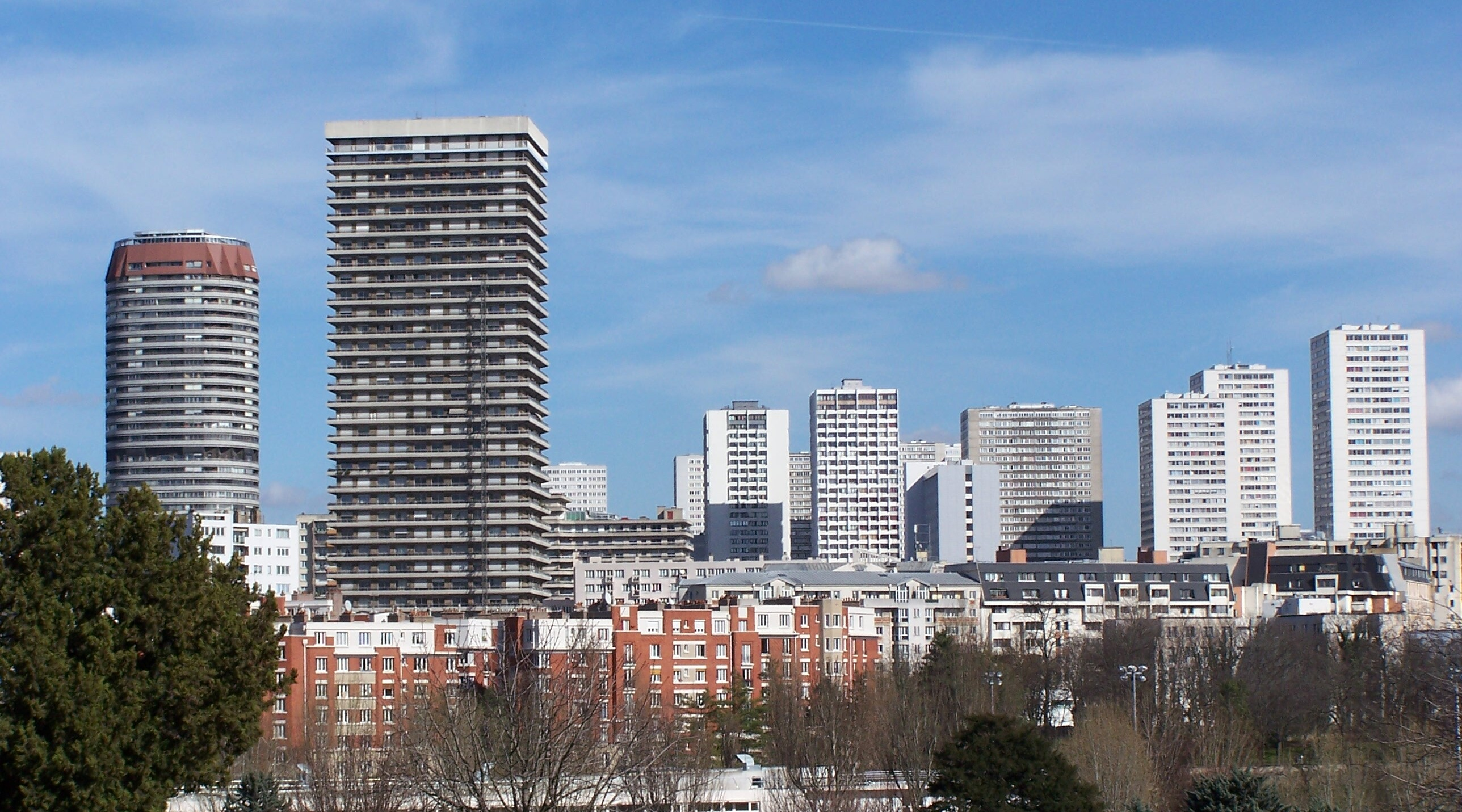
Towers in the 13th arrondissement

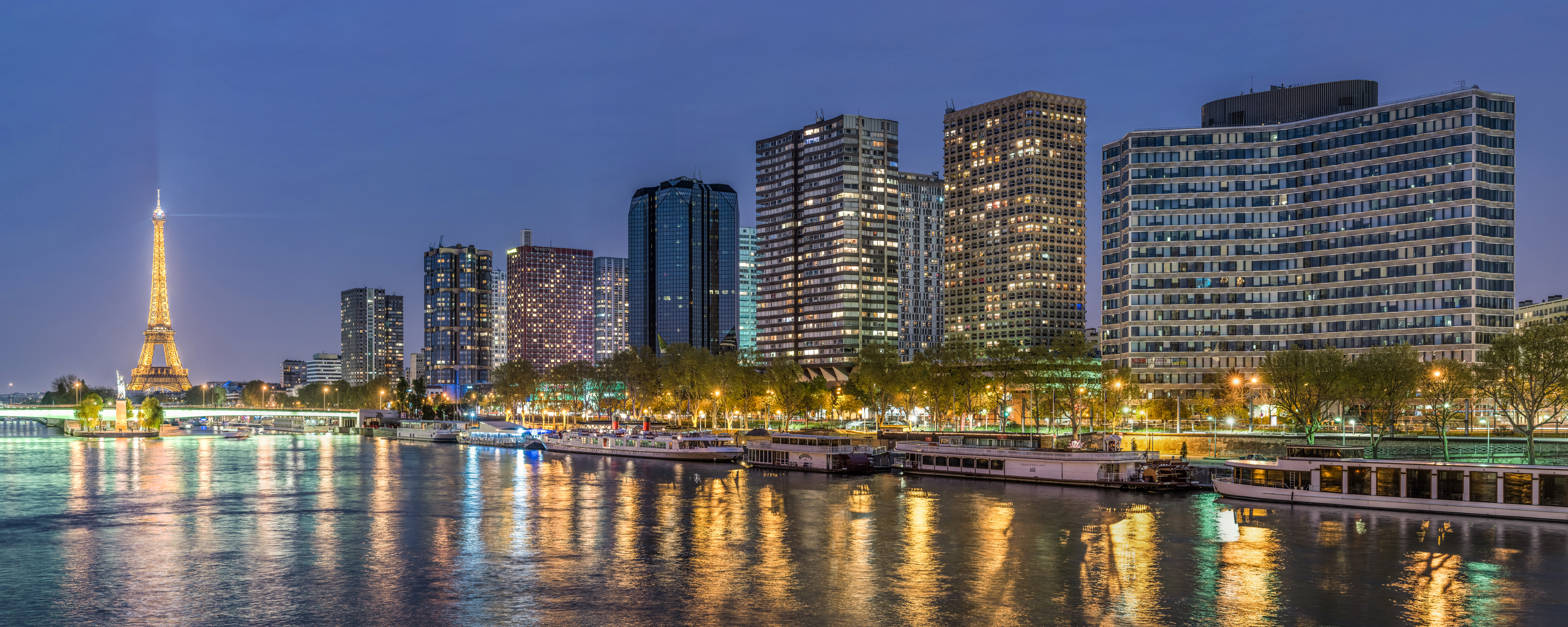
The Front de Seine project in the 15th arrondissement

With a population of over 12 million, Île-de-France, often called the Paris region, is home to most of the tallest buildings in France. Many of the tallest buildings in the Paris metropolitan area are located outside of the city boundaries of Paris, especially in the business district of La Défense. The tallest structure in Paris is the Eiffel Tower in the city's 7th arrondissement at a height of 330 metres (1,083 ft). Completed in 1889 as the gateway to the Exposition Universelle, the Eiffel Tower was the first man-made structure in the world to exceed 300 m (984 ft), and has since become the city's most famous landmark. The tallest habitable building in the Paris region is The Link, a 242 metre (794 ft), 52-storey office skyscraper in La Défense built in 2025. As of 2026, there are 85 high-rise buildings in the Paris region that stand over 100 m (328 ft), the most of any metropolitan area in the European Union. 24 skyscrapers in the Paris region are taller than 150 m (492 ft), the fourth-most in Europe after Moscow, Istanbul, and London.

Very few high-rises were built in Paris in the first half of the 20th century. The Plan Voisin redevelopment of Paris, designed by French-Swiss architect Le Corbusier in 1925, would have replaced a large area of central Paris with identical tower blocks, but the plan was rejected by the city for being too radical. The Tour Albert, a 23-storey high-rise built in 1960, is considered to be the first residential high-rise in Paris. It preceded the arrival of larger-scale residential projects in the city in the 1960s and 1970s in the outer arrondissements, particularly the Italie 13 urbanism project in the 13th arrondissement. The project led to the creation of numerous towers in the south of the arrondissement, most notably the Les Olympiades complex. Italie 13 was met with public criticism as its towers were erected. French president Valéry Giscard d'Estaing decided to stop the Italie 13 project in 1974, leaving it only partially completed.

The business district of La Défense emerged in the 1960s and quickly added a number of commercial skyscrapers to its skyline in the early 1970s, including the Tour Les Poissons and Tour Areva. Around that time, the Tour Montparnasse was constructed in Paris as part of the redevelopment of the old Montparnasse station. The 210 m (689 ft) tall office skyscraper was quickly disliked by many Parisians due to its height, location, and monolithic appearance. In 1977, four years after its completion, Paris prohibited the construction of buildings with over seven storeys from the city centre. Following the ban, high-rise development in the Paris region has mainly occurred in La Défense. The 111 m (364 ft) tall Grande Arche was built in 1989 on the Axe historique, placing it in the centre of the La Défense skyline when seen from the Arc de Triomphe. The La Défense skyline has expanded significantly in the 21st century with skyscrapers such as Tour T1, Tour D2, Tour Majunga and Tour Hekla. Tour First underwent a height increase from 159 m (522 ft) to 231 m (758 ft) in 2011, making it the tallest building in France before it was surpassed by The Link in 2025.

In 2010, the city of Paris relaxed its height limit in select areas. This allowed a few new skyscrapers to be built in the city, including a new building for the Tribunal de Paris and the Tours Duo complex. After construction began on the Tour Triangle, a 42-storey pyramidal skyscraper, a new height limit was imposed in 2023, banning skyscrapers in Paris once again. Today, most of the Paris region's high-rises are located in La Défense, to the west of the city of Paris; in the 13th arrondissement; and in Front de Seine, located along the Seine near the Eiffel Tower in the 15th arrondissement. Other high-rise buildings are scattered throughout the region, mainly in close proximity to the Périphérique freeway. These include Les Mercuriales in Bagnolet, the Tour Pleyel in Saint-Denis, the Hôtel Hyatt Regency Paris Étoile in the city proper, and the Tour Montparnasse.

== History ==
Number of buildings by height in the Paris region by the end of each year, based on the information in this article. Click on the legend to toggle a specific height on or off. View chart definition.

== Map of tallest buildings ==
=== Grand Paris ===
The map below shows the distribution of high-rise buildings taller than 100 m (328 ft) in the Paris region, with La Défense visible on the northwest of the map.

Buildings taller than 100 m (328 ft) in the Paris region.
- 1970s
- 2010s
- 2020s
4 Tour Montparnasse
19 Tribunal de Paris
28 Hyatt Regency Paris Étoile
30 Tour Pleyel
33 Tour La Villette
35 Tour Prélude
37 Tour Ponant
42 Tour Maestro
43 Pullman Paris Montparnasse Hotel
52 Tour Fugue
66 Tour Giralda
79 Tour Cantate
82 Tour Panorama
83 Tour Totem
85 Tour Sequana

=== La Défense ===
The map below shows the distribution of high-rise buildings taller than 100 m (328 ft) in La Défense. Each marker is numbered by the building's height rank, and coloured by the decade of its completion.

Buildings taller than 100 m (328 ft) in La Défense.
- 1960s
- 1970s
- 1980s
- 1990s
- 2000s
- 2010s
- 2020s
1 The Link
2 Tour First
3 Tour Hekla
5 Tour Majunga
6 Tour T1
7 Tour Granite
8 Tour Saint-Gobain
10 Tour Total
11 Tour Areva
12 Tour D2
13 Tour Alicante
14 Tour Chassagne
15 Tour CB21
16 Tour Carpe Diem
17 Cœur Défense
18 Tour Alto
20 Tour Trinity
21 Tour Ariane
22 Tour Égée
23 Tour Adria
24 Tour Les Poissons
25 Tour Légende
26 Tour CBX
27 Tour Eqho
29 Tour Défense 2000
31 Tour Michelet
32 Tour France
34 Tour Aurore
36 Tour Europlaza
40 Tour W
41 Tour Neptune
44 Tour Franklin
47 Tour Manhattan
48 Grande Arche
49 Tour Europe
50 Tour CGI
51 Tour Eve
53 Tour Atlantique
54 Opus 12 Tower
55 Tour Initiale
56 Tour Nuage 1
57 Tour Nuage 2
58 Tour Sequoia
65 Tour Gambetta
72 Tour Emblem
73 L'archipel
80 Tour Landscape
81 Tour Blanche
84 Tour Allianz One

== Tallest buildings ==
This list ranks completed buildings in the Paris region that stand at least 100 m (328 ft) tall as of 2026, based on standard height measurement. This includes spires and architectural details but does not include antenna masts. The “Year” column indicates the year of completion. Buildings tied in height are sorted by year of completion with earlier buildings ranked first, and then alphabetically.

Was the tallest building in the Paris region upon completion

Rank	Name	Image	Location	Height m (ft)	Floors	Year	Purpose	Notes
N/A	Eiffel Tower		Paris; 7th arr. 48°51′30″N 2°17′40″E	330 (1,083)	3	1889	Communication; Observation	The world-famous tower was constructed as a centrepiece for the 1889 World's Fair and to commemorate the centennial anniversary of the French Revolution. There are three levels for visitors. Not a habitable building; included for comparison purposes.
1	The Link		La Défense; Puteaux; 48°53′15″N 2°14′52″E	242 (794)	52	2025	Office	Tallest building in Puteaux, the Paris region, and in France. Tallest building completed in the Paris region in the 2020s. The complex consists of two office towers named Arche and Seine, connected by 35 platforms, hence the name.
2	Tour First		La Défense; Courbevoie; 48°53′20″N 2°15′06″E	231 (758)	56	1974 (Note: This building's height was later increased to its current height in 2011.)	Office	Tallest building in Courbevoie. The building was originally built to a height of 159 m (522 ft) and 40 storeys in 1974. Large-scale renovation of the tower began in 2007 and was completed in 2011, resulting in a height increase to 231 m (758 ft) including its spire. Tallest building in the Paris region from 2011 to 2025. Formerly known as Tour UAP from 1974 to 1998, and as Tour Axa from 1998 to 2007.
3	Tour Hekla		La Défense; Puteaux; 48°53′20″N 2°14′06″E	220 (722)	48	2022	Office	Designed by renowned French architect Jean Nouvel. Named after the Icelandic volcano Hekla.
4	Tour Montparnasse		Paris; 15th arr. 48°50′31″N 2°19′19″E	210 (689)	58	1973	Office	Tallest building in the city of Paris since 1973. Tallest building in the Paris region from 1973 to 2011. The building's controversial height, location, and design led to a ban of the construction of buildings over seven storeys tall in the city centre. Work began in 2026 to renovate the tower, including the replacement of the facade. The renovation is expected to be complete in 2030.
5	Tour Majunga		La Défense; Puteaux; 48°53′20″N 2°14′37″E	194 (636)	45	2014	Office	Tallest building completed in the Paris region in the 2010s.
6	Tour T1		La Défense; Courbevoie; 48°53′43″N 2°14′23″E	185 (607)	36	2008	Office	Tallest building completed in the Paris region in the 2000s. Also known as the Tour GDF Suez.
7	Tour Granite		La Défense; Nanterre; 48°53′30″N 2°13′46″E	183 (600)	36	2008	Office	Tallest building in Nanterre. Built as a complement to the Tours Société Générale.
8	Tour Saint-Gobain		La Défense; Courbevoie; 48°53′23″N 2°14′58″E	180 (591)	41	2019	Office	Headquarters of Saint-Gobain.
9	Tour Duo 1		Paris; 13th arr. 48°49′29″N 2°22′59″E	180 (591)	39	2021	Office	Tallest building in the 13th arrondissement.
10	Tour Total		La Défense; Courbevoie; 48°53′33″N 2°14′36″E	179 (587)	48	1985	Office	Tallest building completed in the Paris region in the 1980s. Previously known as Tour Elf from 1985 to 1999, and Tour TotalFinaElf from 1999 to 2003.
11	Tour Areva		La Défense; Courbevoie; 48°53′32″N 2°14′31″E	178 (584)	44	1974	Office	Formerly known as Tour Framatome and Tour Fiat. The building is black and in the shape of a square prism.
12	Tour D2		La Défense; Courbevoie; 48°53′25″N 2°14′53″E	171 (561)	36	2014	Office	Features a notable concrete and steel exo-structure.
13	Tour Alicante		La Défense; Puteaux; 48°53′32″N 2°13′50″E	167 (548)	37	1995	Office	One half of the Tours Société Générale (Société Générale Twin Towers). The complex was later joined by Tour Granite in 2008.
14	Tour Chassagne		La Défense; Nanterre; 48°53′30″N 2°13′51″E	167 (548)	37	1995	Office	One half of the Tours Société Générale (Société Générale Twin Towers). The complex was later joined by Tour Granite in 2008.
15	Tour CB21		La Défense; Courbevoie; 48°53′20″N 2°14′59″E	166 (545)	42	1974	Office	Formerly known as Tour Gan.
16	Tour Carpe Diem		La Défense; Courbevoie; 48°53′29″N 2°14′44″E	161.9 (531)	36	2013	Office	
17	Cœur Défense		La Défense; Courbevoie; 48°53′29″N 2°14′37″E	161 (528)	39	2001	Office	
18	Tour Alto		La Défense; Courbevoie; 48°53′22″N 2°15′04″E	159.9 (525)	38	2020	Office	
19	Tribunal de Paris		Paris; 17th arr. 48°53′43″N 2°18′36″E	159.7 (524)	38	2017	Government	The Tribunal de Paris is the largest court in France by caseload.
20	Tour Trinity		La Défense; Puteaux; 48°53′35″N 2°14′28″E	157.2 (516)	32	2020	Office	
21	Tour Ariane		La Défense; Puteaux; 48°53′21″N 2°14′37″E	155.5 (510)	40	1975	Office	
22	Tour Égée		La Défense; Courbevoie; 48°53′42″N 2°14′18″E	155 (509)	39	1999	Office	Also known as Tour Ernst & Young.
23	Tour Adria		La Défense; Courbevoie; 48°53′42″N 2°14′12″E	155 (509)	40	2002	Office	Also known as Tour Technip.
24	Tour Les Poissons		La Défense; Courbevoie; 48°53′40″N 2°15′06″E	150 (492)	42	1970	Mixed-use	Mixed-use residential and office building. Tallest building in the Paris region from 1970 to 1973.
25	Tour Légende		La Défense; Puteaux; 48°53′23″N 2°14′29″E	148 (486)	41	2001	Office	Also known as PB6 and Tour EDF.
26	Tour CBX		La Défense; Courbevoie; 48°53′28″N 2°14′48″E	143 (469)	32	2005	Office	Also known as Tour Dexia.
27	Tour Eqho		La Défense; Courbevoie; 48°53′32″N 2°14′48″E	140 (459)	40	1988	Office	Also known as Tour Descartes and Tour IBM.
28	Hyatt Regency Paris Étoile		Paris; 17th arr. 48°52′48″N 2°17′03″E	137 (449)	34	1974	Hotel	The 995-room hotel was built in 1974 as the Hôtel Concorde La Fayette. It became the Hyatt Regency Paris Etoile in 2013.
29	Tour Défense 2000		La Défense; Puteaux; 48°53′15″N 2°14′12″E	137 (449)	45	1974	Residential	
30	Tour Pleyel		Saint-Denis; 48°55′13″N 2°20′42″E	129 (423)	37	1973	Mixed-use	Mixed-use office and residential building. Tallest building in Saint-Denis.
31	Tour Michelet		La Défense; Puteaux; 48°53′18″N 2°14′43″E	127 (417)	34	1985	Office	
32	Tour France		La Défense; Puteaux; 48°52′59″N 2°14′51″E	126 (413)	41	1973	Residential	
33	Tour La Villette		Aubervilliers; 48°54′06″N 2°23′16″E	125 (410)	35	1973	Office	Tallest building in Aubervilliers. Formerly known as the Tour Daewoo, Tour Périphérique, and Tour Olympe.
34	Tour Aurore		La Défense; Courbevoie; 48°53′24″N 2°14′50″E	124.5 (408)	35	1970 (Note: This building's height was later increased to its current height in 2022.)	Office	Originally built to a height of 100 m (328 ft) in 1970. Tour Aurore was slated for demolition to make way for the planned Tour Air2. After Tour Air2 was cancelled, the building was renovated. The renovation was completed in 2022, raising the building to its current height.
35	Tour Prélude		Paris; 19th arr. 48°53′23″N 2°22′23″E	123 (404)	39	1979	Residential	Part of the Orgues de Flandre residential complex.
36	Tour Europlaza		La Défense; Courbevoie; 48°53′30″N 2°14′42″E	122.7 (403)	31	1972	Office	
37	Tour Ponant		Bagnolet; 48°52′03″N 2°24′56″E	122 (400)	34	1975	Office	Tallest building in Bagnolet together with Tour Levant. One half of Les Mercuriales.
38	Tour Levant		Bagnolet; 48°52′03″N 2°24′53″E	122 (400)	34	1977	Office	Tallest building in Bagnolet together with Tour Ponant. One half of Les Mercuriales.
39	Tour Duo 2		Paris; 13th arr. 48°49′31″N 2°22′56″E	122 (400)	27	2021	Mixed-use	Mixed-use office and hotel building.
40	Tour W		La Défense; Puteaux; 48°53′21″N 2°14′20″E	121.7 (399)	35	1974	Office	Formerly known as Tour Winterthur. It was later renamed to Tour W in 2013. In 2019, French software development company Axway installed an illuminated sign atop the façade.
41	Tour Neptune		La Défense; Courbevoie; 48°53′22″N 2°15′14″E	117 (384)	28	1975	Office	
42	Tour Maestro	—	Saint-Denis; 48°55′12″N 2°20′47″E	117 (384)	26	2025	Office	
43	Pullman Paris Montparnasse Hotel		Paris; 14th arr. 48°50′18″N 2°19′15″E	116 (381)	31	1974	Hotel	Formerly known as the Paris-Sheraton Hotel, Hotel Montparnasse Park, and Le Méridien Montparnasse.
44	Tour Franklin		La Défense; Puteaux; 48°53′20″N 2°14′26″E	114.7 (376)	33	1972	Office	
45	Préfecture des Hauts-de-Seine		La Défense; Nanterre; 48°53′50″N 2°12′57″E	113 (371)	25	1974	Office	
46	Tour Super-Italie		Paris; 13th arr. 48°49′18″N 2°21′34″E	112 (367)	38	1972	Residential	Also known as Immeuble Super-Italie.
47	Tour Manhattan		La Défense; Courbevoie; 48°53′23″N 2°14′54″E	111 (364)	32	1975	Office	First tower in La Défense not to have a rectangular shape.
48	Grande Arche		La Défense; Puteaux; 48°53′33″N 2°14′09″E	111 (364)	35	1989	Office	The Grande Arche also serves as a monument to humanity and humanitarian ideals. The cube-shaped structure is one of the most recognizable landmarks in La Défense.
49	Tour Europe	—	La Défense; Courbevoie; 48°53′27″N 2°14′45″E	110 (361)	28	1969	Office	Also known as CB14. Tallest building in the Paris region briefly from 1969 to 1970.
50	Tour CGI		La Défense; Courbevoie; 48°53′25″N 2°14′50″E	110 (361)	32	1971	Office	Formerly known as Tour Logica (Logica Tower) and CB16 Tower. The building was renovated in 2003.
51	Tour Eve		La Défense; Puteaux; 48°53′16″N 2°14′30″E	109 (358)	30	1974	Mixed-use	Mixed-use residential and office building.
52	Tour Fugue	—	Paris; 19th arr. 48°53′25″N 2°22′27″E	108 (354)	35	1972	Residential	Part of the Orgues de Flandre residential complex.
53	Tour Atlantique		La Défense; Puteaux; 48°53′22″N 2°14′31″E	106 (348)	27	1970	Office	
54	Opus 12 Tower		La Défense; Puteaux; 48°53′23″N 2°14′34″E	106 (348)	25	1973	Office	Formerly known as Tour du Crédit Lyonnais and also known as PB12. Renovated by Bouygues from 2002 to 2004.
55	Tour Initiale		La Défense; Puteaux; 48°53′13″N 2°15′05″E	105 (344)	30	1966	Office	Tallest building in the Paris region from 1966 to 1969.
56	Tour Nuage 1		La Défense; Nanterre; 48°53′25″N 2°13′38″E	105 (344)	37	1977	Residential	Part of the Tours Aillaud.
57	Tour Nuage 2		La Défense; Nanterre; 48°53′20″N 2°13′40″E	105 (344)	37	1977	Residential	Part of the Tours Aillaud.
58	Tour Sequoia		La Défense; Puteaux; 48°53′38″N 2°14′25″E	105 (344)	33	1990	Office	Also known as Tour Esplanade, Tour SFR, Tour Cegetel, and Tour Bull.
59	Tour Antoine et Cléopâtre	—	Paris; 13th arr. 48°49′45″N 2°21′26″E	104 (341)	38	1970	Residential	Part of Italie 13.
60	Tour Cortina	—	Paris; 13th arr. 48°49′28″N 2°21′52″E	104 (341)	34	1970	Residential	Part of Les Olympiades.
61	Tour Athènes	—	Paris; 13th arr. 48°49′34″N 2°21′49″E	104 (341)	36	1972	Residential	Part of Les Olympiades.
62	Tour Mexico	—	Paris; 13th arr. 48°49′33″N 2°21′52″E	104 (341)	36	1972	Residential	Part of Les Olympiades.
63	Tour Sapporo	—	Paris; 13th arr. 48°49′35″N 2°21′52″E	104 (341)	36	1972	Residential	Part of Les Olympiades.
64	Tour Helsinki	—	Paris; 13th arr. 48°49′29″N 2°21′49″E	104 (341)	37	1974	Residential	Part of Les Olympiades.
65	Tour Gambetta	—	La Défense; Courbevoie; 48°53′38″N 2°14′35″E	104 (341)	37	1975	Residential	
66	Tour Giralda	—	Paris; 13th arr. 48°51′33″N 2°24′28″E	104 (341)	33	1975 (Note: The exact year of construction of the Tour Giralda is uncertain. It is known to be during the 1970s.)	Residential	Also known as 78 Rue de Vitruve.
67	Tour Anvers	—	Paris; 13th arr. 48°49′29″N 2°21′59″E	104 (341)	36	1976	Residential	Part of Les Olympiades.
68	Tour Londres	—	Paris; 13th arr. 48°49′30″N 2°21′59″E	104 (341)	36	1976	Residential	Part of Les Olympiades.
69	Tour Tokyo	—	Paris; 13th arr. 48°49′23″N 2°22′02″E	104 (341)	36	1976	Residential	Part of Les Olympiades.
70	Tour Chéops	—	Paris; 13th arr. 48°50′00″N 2°21′58″E	103 (338)	35	1974	Residential	Part of Italie 13.
71	Tour Mykérinos	—	Paris; 13th arr. 48°50′01″N 2°22′01″E	103 (338)	31	1974	Residential	Part of Italie 13. Also known as Menkaure.
72	Tour Emblem		La Défense; Courbevoie; 48°53′45″N 2°14′16″E	103 (338)	26	1998	Office	Formerly known as Tour Cegetel and Tour Cedre. Renovated from 2020 to 2021.
73	L'archipel		La Défense; Nanterre; 48°53′50″N 2°13′35″E	102.5 (336)	24	2022	Office	Also known as 1973 Boulevard de la Défense and The Groues. Headquarters of French concessions and construction company Vinci.
74	Tour Ferrare	—	Paris; 13th arr. 48°49′16″N 2°21′59″E	102 (335)	35	1970	Residential	Part of Italie 13.
75	Tour Palerme	—	Paris; 13th arr. 48°49′11″N 2°21′45″E	102 (335)	35	1970	Residential	Part of Italie 13.
76	Tour Ravenne	—	Paris; 13th arr. 48°49′13″N 2°21′50″E	102 (335)	35	1970	Residential	Part of Italie 13.
77	Tour Ancône	—	Paris; 13th arr. 48°49′18″N 2°22′06″E	102 (335)	35	1975	Residential	Part of Italie 13.
78	Tour Bologne	—	Paris; 13th arr. 48°49′19″N 2°22′04″E	102 (335)	35	1975	Residential	Part of Italie 13.
79	Tour Cantate	—	Paris; 19th arr. 48°53′25″N 2°22′23″E	101 (331)	30	1979	Residential	Part of the Orgues de Flandre residential complex.
80	Tour Landscape		La Défense; Puteaux; 48°53′24″N 2°14′08″E	101 (331)	28	1983 (Note: This building's height was later increased to its current height in 2020.)	Office	Formerly known as Tour Pascal B. Originally built to a height of 95 m (312 ft) in 1983. In 2020, the building was renovated and given a height increase to 101 m (331 ft).
81	Tour Blanche		La Défense; Courbevoie; 48°53′26″N 2°14′46″E	100 (328)	27	1967	Office	Formerly known as CB15, Tour Aquitaine, Tour AIG, and Tour Chartis. Partially renovated in 2004, it underwent further renovations from 2012 to 2014, after which it was renamed Tour Blanche..
82	Tour Panorama	—	Paris; 15th arr. 48°50′54″N 2°17′04″E	100 (328)	31	1974	Residential	
83	Tour Totem		Paris; 15th arr. 48°51′01″N 2°17′02″E	100 (328)	31	1979	Residential	Part of Front de Seine.
84	Tour Allianz One	—	La Défense; Puteaux; 48°53′15″N 2°14′57″E	100 (328)	22	1984	Office	Formerly known as Tour AGF-Athena, Tour PFA, or Tour Athena.
85	Tour Sequana		Issy-les-Moulineaux; 48°50′01″N 2°16′08″E	100 (328)	24	2010	Office	Tallest building in Issy-les-Moulineaux, and part of the Val de Seine business district. Also known as Tour Mozart.

== Tallest under construction or proposed ==
The Authority managing La Défense, the EPAD, has launched several contests for new towers in a large scale operation of renovation of the business district. Other proposed projects are currently being talked about in other municipalities of the inner suburbs such as Issy-les-Moulineaux, Boulogne-Billancourt or Saint-Denis.

=== Under construction ===
The following table includes buildings under construction in the Paris region that are planned to be at least 100 m (328 ft) tall as of 2026, based on standard height measurement. The “Year” column indicates the expected year of completion. Buildings that are on hold are not included.

Name	Image	Location	Height m (ft)	Floors	Year	Purpose	Notes
Tour Triangle		Paris; 15th arr.	181.4 (595)	42	2027	Office	

=== Proposed ===
The following table includes approved and proposed buildings in the Paris region that are expected to be at least 100 (328 ft) tall as of 2026, based on standard height measurement. The “Year” column indicates the expected year of completion. A dash “–“ indicates information about the building’s height, floor count, or year of completion is unknown or has not been released.

Name	Location	Height m (ft)	Floors	Purpose	Status	Notes
Tours Sisters Tour 1	La Défense; Courbevoie	229 (751)	55	Office	Approved (On Hold)	
Tour de Charenton	Charenton-le-Pont	210 (689)	–	Mixed-use	Proposed	Mixed-use residential and hotel building.
Tour des Jardins de l'Arche	La Défense; Nanterre	206 (676)	53	Mixed-use	Approved	Mixed-use office and hotel building.
Odyssey - Tour C	La Défense; Courbevoie	187 (614)	47	Office	Approved	
Odyssey - Tour O	La Défense; Courbevoie	178.2 (585)	38	Mixed-use	Approved	Mixed-use office and hotel building.
Tours Sisters Tour 2	La Défense; Courbevoie	131 (430)	–	Hotel	Approved (On Hold)	
Les Lumières Pleyel - Lot R3	Saint-Denis	120 (394)	42	Mixed-use	Proposed	
Odyssey - Tour D	La Défense; Courbevoie	102.4 (336)	24	Mixed-use	Approved	Mixed-use office and residential building.

== Timeline of tallest buildings ==
This lists buildings that once held the title of the tallest building in the Paris region. This excludes structures such as the Eiffel Tower, which has been the tallest structure in the region since its completion.

Name	Image	Years as tallest	Height m (ft)	Floors	Notes
Tour Albert		1960–1966	67 (220)	23	
Tour Initiale		1966–1969	105 (344)	30	
Tour Europe	—	1969–1970	110 (361)	28	
Tour Les Poissons		1970–1973	150 (492)	42	
Tour Montparnasse		1973–2011	210 (689)	58	
Tour First		2011–2025	231 (758)	56	
The Link		2025–present	242 (794)	52	

== See also ==
- List of tallest buildings in France
- List of tallest buildings and structures in London
- List of tallest buildings in Frankfurt
- List of tallest buildings in Warsaw
