= Les Mercuriales =

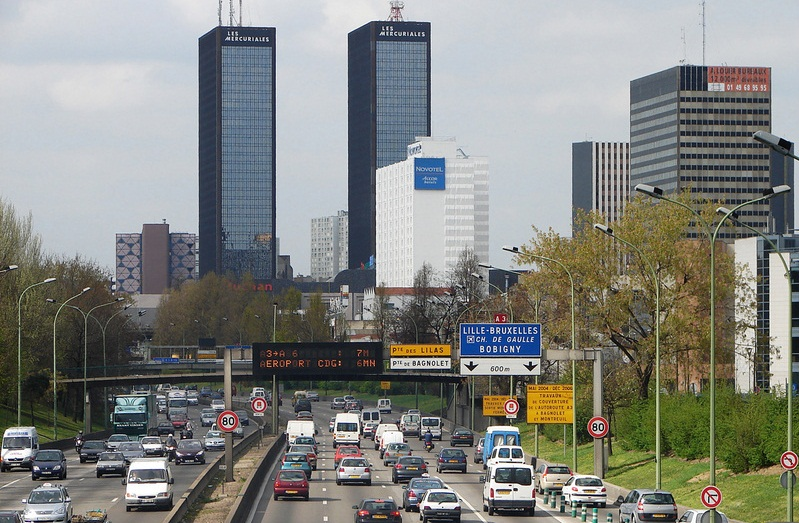
- Les Mercuriales twin towers seen from Bagnolet
- Interactive map of the Les Mercuriales area

General information
- Type: Office
- Location: Bagnolet (Northeast of Paris)
- Coordinates: 48°52′02″N 02°24′55″E
- Completed: 1975

Height
- Antenna spire: 175 m (574 ft) (Tower 1) 150 m (490 ft) (Tower 2)
- Roof: 122 m (400 ft)

Technical details
- Floor count: 33

Design and construction
- Architects: Serge Lana and Alfred H. Milh

Les Mercuriales are twin towers in Bagnolet, along the Boulevard Peripherique, in Paris, France. They were built in 1975, and are named Levant (Eastern) and Ponant (Western). They are the tallest twin towers in the EU and Europe’s second tallest twin towers after City of Capitals in Moscow. The architecture of the tower was inspired by the twin towers of the former World Trade Center in New York City.

== Description ==
These towers were part of a larger project in the business district of eastern Paris, designed to rebalance the western district La Defense. This project was interrupted by the first oil crisis, leaving the isolated towers on the A3 motorway interchange.

Not counting the antennas, the towers are the third highest in the Seine-Saint-Denis administrative division, behind Tour Pleyel (143m) and behind the Tour La Villette (125m). Including the antennas, the West Tower is the highest in Seine-Saint-Denis with a peak at about 175m, while the East Tower is the second highest at 141m.

== Design and construction ==
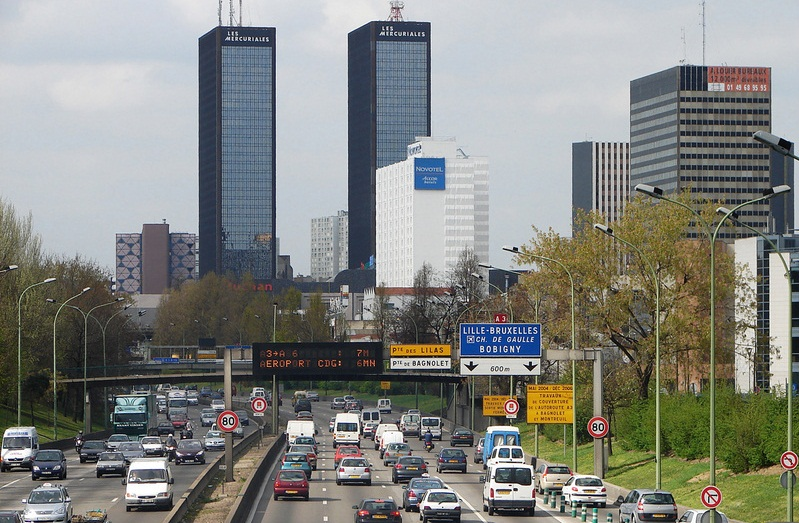
Les Mercuriales twin towers seen from Bagnolet

- The architecture of the tower was inspired by the twin towers of the former World Trade Center in New York City.
- The two towers are built on a foundation consisting of common equipment rooms and loading docks, accessible to heavy load trucks.
- Each tower consists of a reinforced concrete central core encompassing the elevators, freight elevators, escalators and vertical ducting. The central elevator core on each floor is protected by automatically closing fire doors. This core supports the floor slabs, supported by columns on the periphery.
- The columns are set back from the edge of the floor slabs to allow a continuous façade skin, stiffened with metal studs. The non-structural exterior curtain wall allows maximum natural lighting to the floors. It also reduces the visual mass of towers and provides a more fluid design, accentuated by their location in a residential area of low height.
- The partitioning of offices is completely modular and each floor can change from closed offices to full open plan.
- The elevator's batteries for each tower are distributed in two groups of six. Each group serves the first 16 levels or the next 15. Each battery also includes an outdoor loading dock that connects the basement to all floors.
- The 30th floor is the top floor of the offices. The top two floors consist of local storage, the air conditioning systems and broadcasting equipment.
- A covered central mall distributes the public between the two towers and also serves the common services (canteen, security).

== Antennas ==
At the top of the towers are two antennas. One is administered by TDF (TSF 89.9; Aligre FM / Radio Beur FM and country) and the other by TowerCast (FM Teen, Latina, Neo, Here & Now, FG, Generations / Paris Jazz Radio Libertaire Live FM Radio Campus Paris). It found a total of 10 issuers of 4 kW BY). These transmitters generate radio interference affecting 40 000 households.

== See also ==
- Skyscraper
- List of tallest structures in Paris
