= Tours Société Générale =

Skyscrapers in La Défense, France

- (Alicante and Chassagne)
- Société Générale twin towers

General information
- Type: Office
- Location: La Défense (Nanterre)
- Coordinates: 48°53′31″N 2°13′50″E
- Completed: 1995

Height
- Antenna spire: 167 m (548 ft)
- Roof: 167 m (548 ft)

Technical details
- Floor count: 37
- Floor area: 125,000 m^{2} (1,350,000 sq ft)

Design and construction
- Architects: Michel Andrault, Pierre Parat, Nicolas Ayoub

Société Générale Twin Towers are two office skyscrapers located in La Défense, a high-rise business district, and in Nanterre, France, west of Paris. Their exterior designs are identical. They are the second tallest twin towers in the EU and Europe's third tallest twin towers after City of Capitals in Moscow and Les Mercuriales twin towers in Paris.

The towers were built and opened in 1995 to become the head office of the Société Générale, one of France's largest banking groups. Before the twin towers were constructed, Société Générale's headquarters were located in Paris.

== Features ==
The roof and structural height of both towers is at 167 m (548 ft) above ground. The roofs of the towers are sharply inclined.

The towers were the tallest skyscrapers built in La Défense since the Tour Total in 1985. It was one of the first buildings in France to receive the High Quality Environmental standard label.

The northern tower is named tour Alicante and the southern one tour Chassagne. In its interior design, Chassagne is decorated with white stone from the village of Chassagne in Auvergne, whereas Alicante is decorated with red marble from Alicante in Spain. Both towers share the same platform and stand about 40 m (130 ft) apart.

Despite the large office space available in the current twin towers, Société Générale needed yet more space and so it launched the construction of a third skyscraper, the 183 m (600 ft) tall Tour Granite, which stands immediately behind the twin towers and was opened in 2008.

== See also ==
- Skyscraper
- La Défense
- List of tallest structures in Paris
