= Tour Ariane =

Office skyscraper located in La Défense

- Interactive map of the Tour Ariane area

General information
- Type: Office
- Location: La Défense (Puteaux)
- Coordinates: 48°53′22″N 2°14′37″E
- Construction started: 1973
- Completed: 1975
- Owner: Unibail-Rodamco

Height
- Antenna spire: 152 m (499 ft)
- Roof: 152 m (499 ft)

Technical details
- Floor count: 36
- Floor area: 57,300 m^{2} (617,000 sq ft)

Design and construction
- Architects: Robert Zammit, Jean de Mailly

Website
- parisladefense.com/en/discover/towers/ariane

Tour Ariane (English: Ariane Tower); previously known as tour Générale between 1973 and 1995, is an office skyscraper located in La Défense, the high-rise business district situated west of Paris, France.

Built in 1975, it belongs to the 2nd generation of skyscrapers in La Défense. The tower is 152 m (499 ft) tall and has 36 floors. In spite of a very conventional design, the tower offers an interesting and original cladding. The entrance of the tower was modified in the 1990s. The tower has been undergoing major refurbishment in 2009.

The tower is owned by GIC Private Limited, which acquired the tower from Unibail-Rodamco-Westfield for approximately €465 million in October 2018.

On 27 March 2014, French rock and urban climber Alain Robert, a.k.a. "the French Spider-Man", climbed the famous tower in 45 minutes. Onlookers and police gathered to watch his climb. He was arrested by police and later released without being charged.

== See also ==
Ground-level view of Tour Ariane

- La Défense
- List of tallest structures in Paris
- Skyscraper
