= Tour Carpe Diem =

Skyscraper in Paris

- Interactive map of the Tour Carpe Diem area

General information
- Status: Completed
- Type: Office
- Location: La Défense, Courbevoie, IDF, France
- Coordinates: 48°53′29″N 2°14′45″E
- Construction started: 2010
- Completed: 2013
- Opening: 2013

Height
- Roof: 162 m (531 ft)

Technical details
- Floor count: 36 (+ 2 basement floors)
- Floor area: 47,000 m^{2} (505,900 sq ft)

Design and construction
- Architect: Robert A.M. Stern Architects
- Main contractor: BESIX, Spie Batignolles

The Tour Carpe Diem is a 162-metre (531 ft) tall skyscraper in the La Défense business district, near Paris in France.

The first stone was laid early 2011 by the main contractor BESIX and Spie Batignolles. Completed in 2013, it is located in the municipality of Courbevoie and contains offices.

== Awards ==
The building was nominated for an Architizer award in 2015.

== See also ==
- List of tallest buildings and structures in the Paris region
