= Tour Légende =

Tour EDF
- Interactive map of the Tour EDF area

General information
- Type: Office
- Location: La Défense (Puteaux)
- Coordinates: 48°53′23″N 2°14′29″E
- Construction started: 1997; 29 years ago
- Completed: 2001; 25 years ago

Height
- Antenna spire: 165 m (541 ft)
- Roof: 165 m (541 ft)

Technical details
- Floor count: 41
- Floor area: 57,000 m^{2} (610,000 sq ft)

Design and construction
- Architect: Pei Cobb Freed & Partners

Tour EDF is an office skyscraper located in La Défense, the high-rise business district west of Paris, France.

The tower was built for Électricité de France (EDF), France's main electricity company, and hosts the company's offices. Tour EDF is 165 m (541 ft) tall. The skyscraper's ground shape is elliptical, with a maximum length of 70 m (230 ft) and a maximum width of 32 m (105 ft).

== Description ==
Ground-level view of tower

Tour EDF's most striking characteristic consists in the extrusion of a conic section of the tower on its northern edge. The resulting conic hole extends from the ground floor to the 26th floor and serves as the main entrance to the tower, an entrance built under a wide circular canopy 24 m (79 ft) in diameter. As a consequence, the length of the tower is slightly less at its base than at its top.

The cladding of the tower alternates horizontal stripes of plain steel and tinted windows.

== See also ==
- 71 South Wacker - a similar building designed by the same firm in Chicago, formerly known as the Hyatt Center
- List of tallest structures in Paris
