= Tour Eqho =

- Tour Eqho
- Interactive map of the Tour Eqho area

General information
- Type: Office
- Location: La Défense (Courbevoie)
- Coordinates: 48°53′32″N 2°14′48″E
- Completed: 1988

Height
- Antenna spire: 130 m (430 ft)
- Roof: 130 m (430 ft)

Technical details
- Floor count: 40
- Floor area: 100,000 m^{2} (1,100,000 sq ft)

Design and construction
- Architects: Jean Willerval, Fernando Urquijo, Giorgio Macola

Tour Eqho (also known as Tour IBM, and Tour Descartes) is an office skyscraper located in La Défense business district situated west of Paris, France.

Built in 1988, the tower, with a height of 130 metres, belongs to the third generation of towers in La Défense. The tower takes the shape of a parallelepiped in which a semi-cylinder would have been extruded on the main façade. Tour Descartes used to host the French headquarters of IBM Corporation until 2010. It now hosts a variety of companies with KPMG taking the most floors.

Bloomberg News reported that the building is nicknamed “the urinal” by real estate brokers because of its distinctive shape.

== See also ==
- Skyscraper
- La Défense
- List of tallest structures in Paris
