= Préfecture des Hauts-de-Seine =

Administrative building located in Nanterre

- Préfecture des Hauts-de-Seine
- Interactive map of the Préfecture des Hauts-de-Seine area

General information
- Type: Office
- Location: Nanterre (West of Paris)
- Coordinates: 48°53′50″N 2°12′57″E
- Completed: 1974

Height
- Antenna spire: 113 m (371 ft)
- Roof: 113 m (371 ft)

Technical details
- Floor count: 42

Design and construction
- Architect: André Wogenscky

The Préfecture des Hauts-de-Seine (French pronunciation: [pʁefɛktyʁ de o də sɛn]) is an administrative building located in Nanterre, in the inner suburbs of Paris, France.

Designed specifically to host the administrative offices of the préfecture of the Hauts-de-Seine département, the building has a wide base below its 113 m (371 ft)-tall tower.

== See also ==
- Skyscraper
- List of tallest structures in Paris
