= L'archipel =

Office skyscraper in La Défense's Courbevoie

- L'archipel, Paris La Défense
- Interactive map of the L'archipel area

General information
- Status: Under construction
- Type: Commercial offices
- Architectural style: Modernism
- Location: Boulevard de la Défense; La Défense, Nanterre, France
- Coordinates: 48.9001405°N 2.2197162°E
- Completed: 2021
- Owner: Vinci SA

Height
- Antenna spire: 106 m (348 ft)
- Roof: 106 m (348 ft)

Technical details
- Floor count: 24
- Floor area: 74,000 m^{2} (800,000 sq ft)

Design and construction
- Architects: Jean-Paul Viguier and Marc Mimram

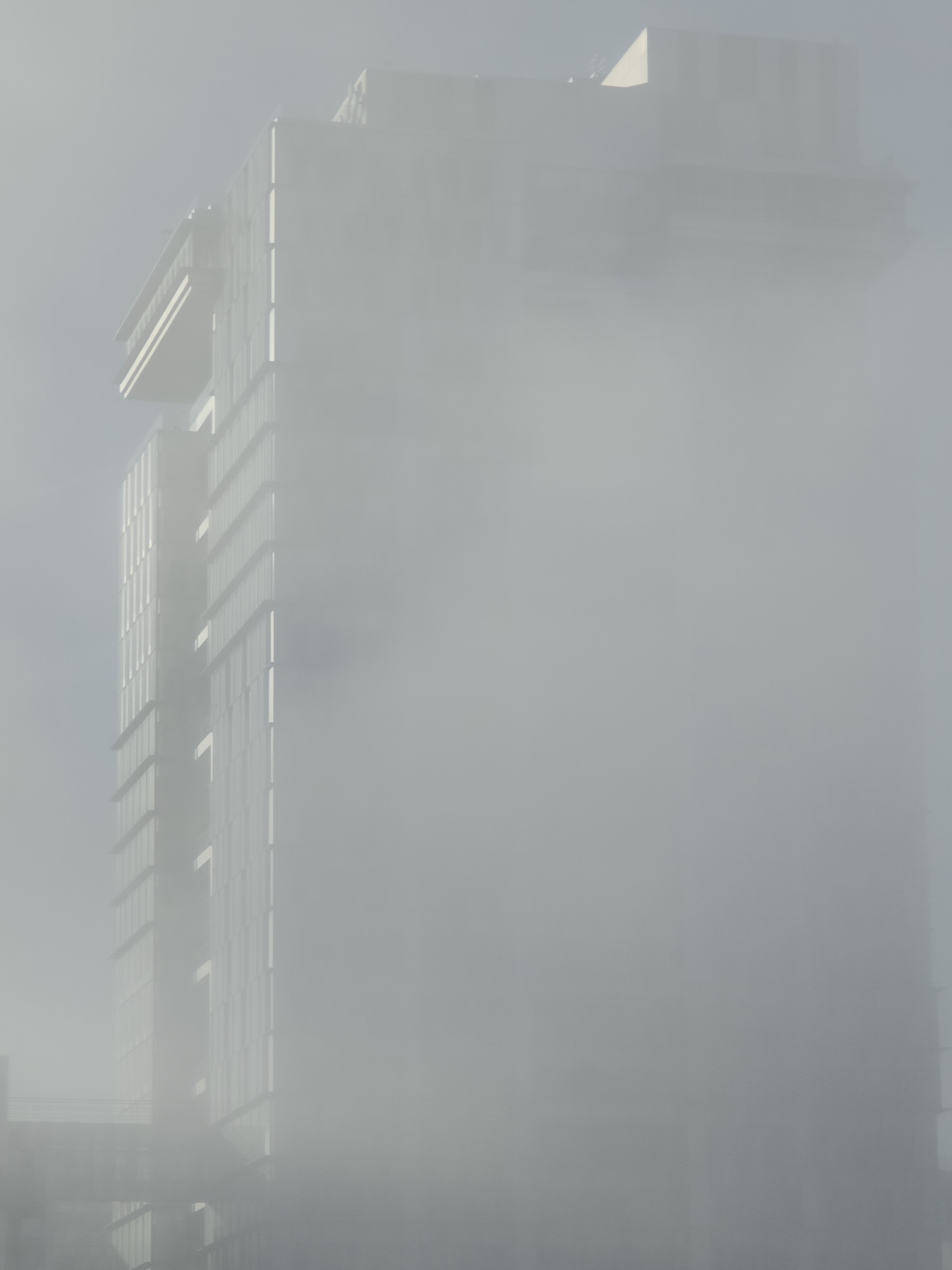
The tower at the Archipel complex, December 2024.

L'archipel (French pronunciation: [laʁʃipɛl]) is an office skyscraper in Nanterre, in La Défense, the business district of the Paris metropolitan area.

The building was completed in 2021, it has 24 floors at 106 m.

It will host the global headquarters of the company Vinci SA.

== See also ==
L'archipel as seen from behind La Défense Arena

- La Défense
- List of tallest buildings and structures in the Paris region
- List of tallest buildings in France
