= Tour CGI =

Office skyscraper in La Défense, Courbevoie, France

- Interactive map of the Tour CGI area

General information
- Type: Office
- Location: 17 Place des Reflets, Courbevoie, La Défense, Paris
- Coordinates: 48.89031°N 2.24709°E
- Completed: 1971
- Renovated: 2003
- Owner: CGI Inc. (former); Partners Group & Aquila Capital (current)

Height
- Roof: 110 m (361 ft)

Technical details
- Floor count: 32
- Floor area: 28,000 m^{2} (301,000 sq ft)

Design and construction
- Architects: Kohn Pedersen Fox; Arsac, Cassagnes, Gravereaux, Saubot (renovation)
- Developer: Hines

Website
- Official website

Tour CGI (formerly known as Logica Tower and CB16 Tower) is an office skyscraper in the Courbevoie commune of the La Défense district in Paris. Completed in 1971 and renovated in 2003, the tower stands at 110 m (361 ft) tall with 32 floors and is the 51st tallest building in Paris.

== History ==
This first-generation tower is surrounded by the Aurore, Europe, CBX, and D2 towers. It underwent asbestos removal and complete restructuring in 2002-2003, followed by a full renovation in 2018-2019. The complex, classified as a High-Rise Building (IGH), offers a total office leasable area of 27,712 m^{2} (298,000 sq ft). It comprises 26 floors above ground level and 6 basement levels, as well as a technical terrace on the 28th floor. The CB16 complex is certified" HQE – Tertiary Buildings in Operation" and offers a range of state-of-the-art services.

Between December 2019 and October 2022, its premises were occupied by CGI as well as by Esset (formerly Foncia IPM).

The code name for the tower's location in the La Défense master plan is CB16.

== See also ==
- List of tallest buildings in France
- List of tallest buildings and structures in the Paris region
