= Tours Aillaud =

Skyscrapers in Nanterre, France

Coordinates: 48°53′22.16″N 2°13′38.61″E

Tours Aillaud is a complex of residential skyscrapers in Paris

The Tours Aillaud (French pronunciation: [tuʁ ajo]; also known as Tours Nuages [tuʁ nɥaʒ]) is a group of residential buildings located in Nanterre, in the inner suburbs of Paris, France.

Built in 1976 at the outskirts of La Défense business district, the Tours Aillaud are named after their main architect, Emile Aillaud. The housing project represents 18 towers including 1,607 apartments all together. The tallest of those are the Tours 1 and 2 with 39 floors and a height of 105 meters. The Tours 3 to 10 have 20 floors and the Tours 11 to 18 have 13 floors.

Despite the differences in height, the towers share the same shape, consisting of the superposition of several cylinders. Their cladding is made of frescos representing clouds in the sky (in French nuages), which is the origin of their nickname.

The frescos in "pate de verre" were designed by Fabio Rieti, son-in-law of Emile Aillaud, while his daughter Laurence Rieti designed the large snake shaped sculpture that constitutes a large part of the playground area near the highest towers. Emile Aillaud noticeably looked after the outdoor area so that there would be one tree per apartment, and so that each apartment would have a designated tree (there were more than 1600 of them).

== Criticism ==
The buildings were derided by art critic Robert Hughes in his 1980 BBC documentary series The Shock of the New:

Without respect for the body as it is, social memory as it stands, there is no such thing as a workable or humane architecture. And that’s why a place like this - La Defence outside Paris, is experienced by everybody, including those who live in it, as a piece of social scar tissue, gimmicky, condescending alphaville modernism. Stick ‘em in concrete boxes and give them some concrete to play on, and then paint it all bright colours because that’s what the kiddies like, and if the kiddies don’t like it, they can write to the minister!

== See also ==
- Skyscraper
- List of tallest structures in Paris
