= Tour France =

Residential skyscraper in Puteaux, France

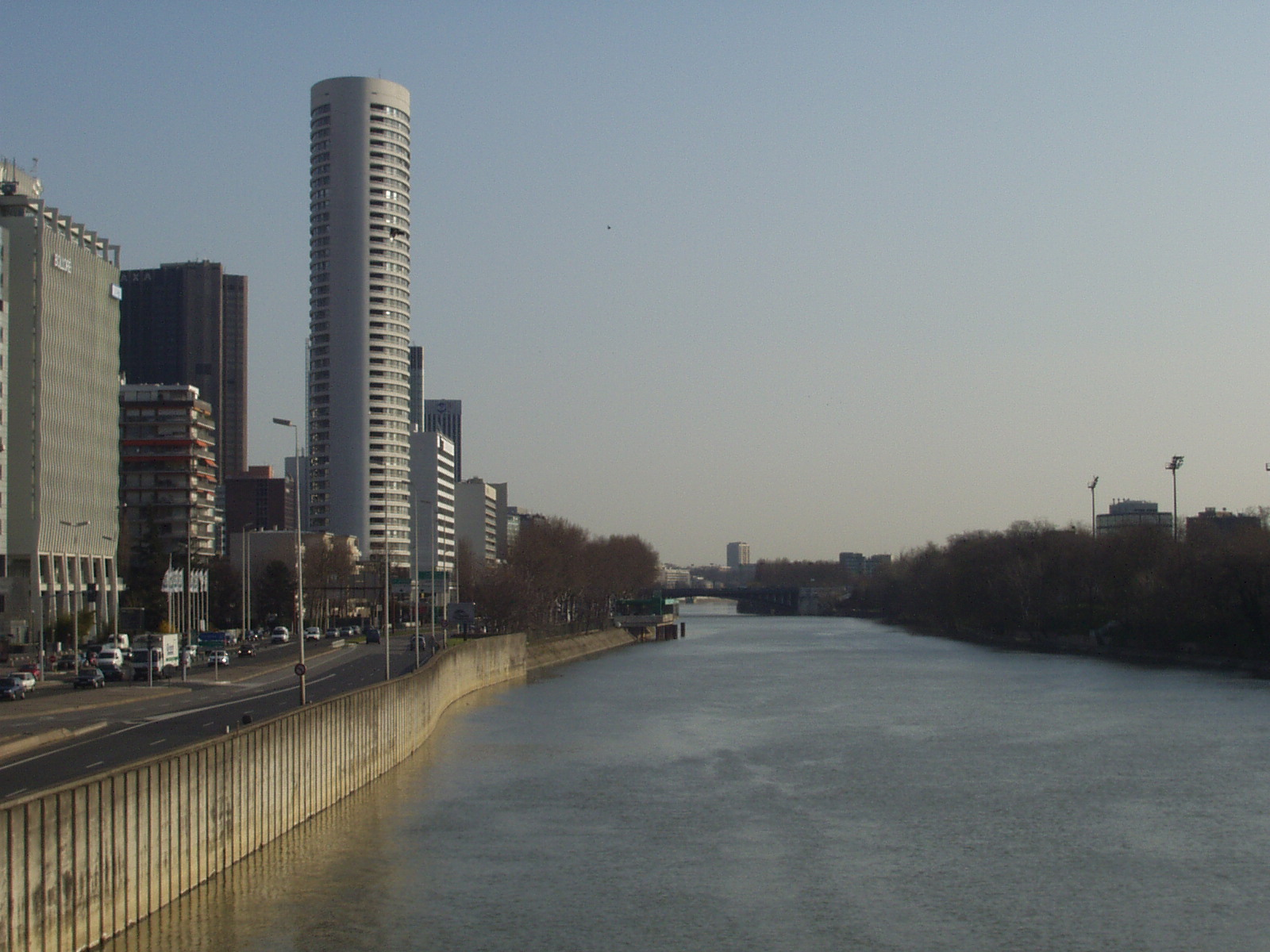
- Tour France
- Interactive map of the Tour France area

General information
- Type: Office
- Location: La Défense (Puteaux)
- Coordinates: 48°52′59″N 2°14′51.5″E
- Completed: 1973

Height
- Antenna spire: 126 m (413 ft)
- Roof: 126 m (413 ft)

Technical details
- Floor count: 40

Design and construction
- Architect: Jean de Mailly

Tour France is a residential skyscraper located in La Défense business district and in Puteaux, France, west of Paris.

Built in 1973, the tower is one of the tallest residential towers in France, with a height of 126 metres. The tower is located on the banks of the Seine and offers a panorama over the historical center of Paris.

== See also ==
- List of tallest structures in Paris
