= Tour D2 =

Coordinates: 48°53′25″N 2°14′52″E

- Interactive map of the Tour D2 area

General information
- Status: Completed
- Type: Office
- Location: La Défense, Courbevoie, IDF, France
- Construction started: 2011
- Completed: 2014
- Opening: 2014

Height
- Roof: 171 m

Technical details
- Floor count: 37
- Floor area: 50,000 m^{2} (540,000 sq ft)

Design and construction
- Architects: Anthony Béchu and Tom Sheehan

Website
- www.vlpandpartners.com/project/tour-d2/

The Tour D2 is a 171-metre (561 ft) tall skyscraper in the La Défense business district outside of Paris, France. It is located in the municipality of Courbevoie and is used for office purposes. It is the 13th tallest building in the Paris region. It includes a public garden on its roof.

== See also ==
- List of tallest buildings and structures in the Paris region
