= Tour W =

- Interactive map of the Tour W area

General information
- Type: Office skyscraper
- Location: La Défense (Puteaux), 102 Terrasse Boieldieu
- Coordinates: 48°53′21.44″N 2°14′20.17″E
- Completed: 1973

Height
- Height: 119 m (390 ft)

Technical details
- Floor count: 31 (+9 underground)
- Floor area: 34,500 square metres (371,000 sq ft)
- Lifts/elevators: 15

Design and construction
- Architects: Delb, Chesnau, Verola, Lalande

The Tour W, formerly the Tour Winterthur, is an office skyscraper in La Défense in the commune of Puteaux west of Paris, France.

The tower was designed by architects Delb, Chesnau, Verola and Lalande. At the time of its completion in 1973, the Tour Winterthur was the fourth highest building in La Défense. It was named after the Swiss insurance company Winterthur Group which owned the building until the end of the 1990s. It was later renamed to Tour W in 2013.

In 1996, renovation works started in the building. In 2019, French software development company Axway installed an illuminated sign atop the façade.

The Tour W has 31 floors and 9 underground floors with an overall floor area of 34,500 square metres (371,000 sq ft).

The building is located near La Défense station served by the Transilien, RER, Paris Metro and tram.

== See also ==
- List of tallest buildings and structures in the Paris region
