= Tour Europlaza =

Skyscraper in Paris, France

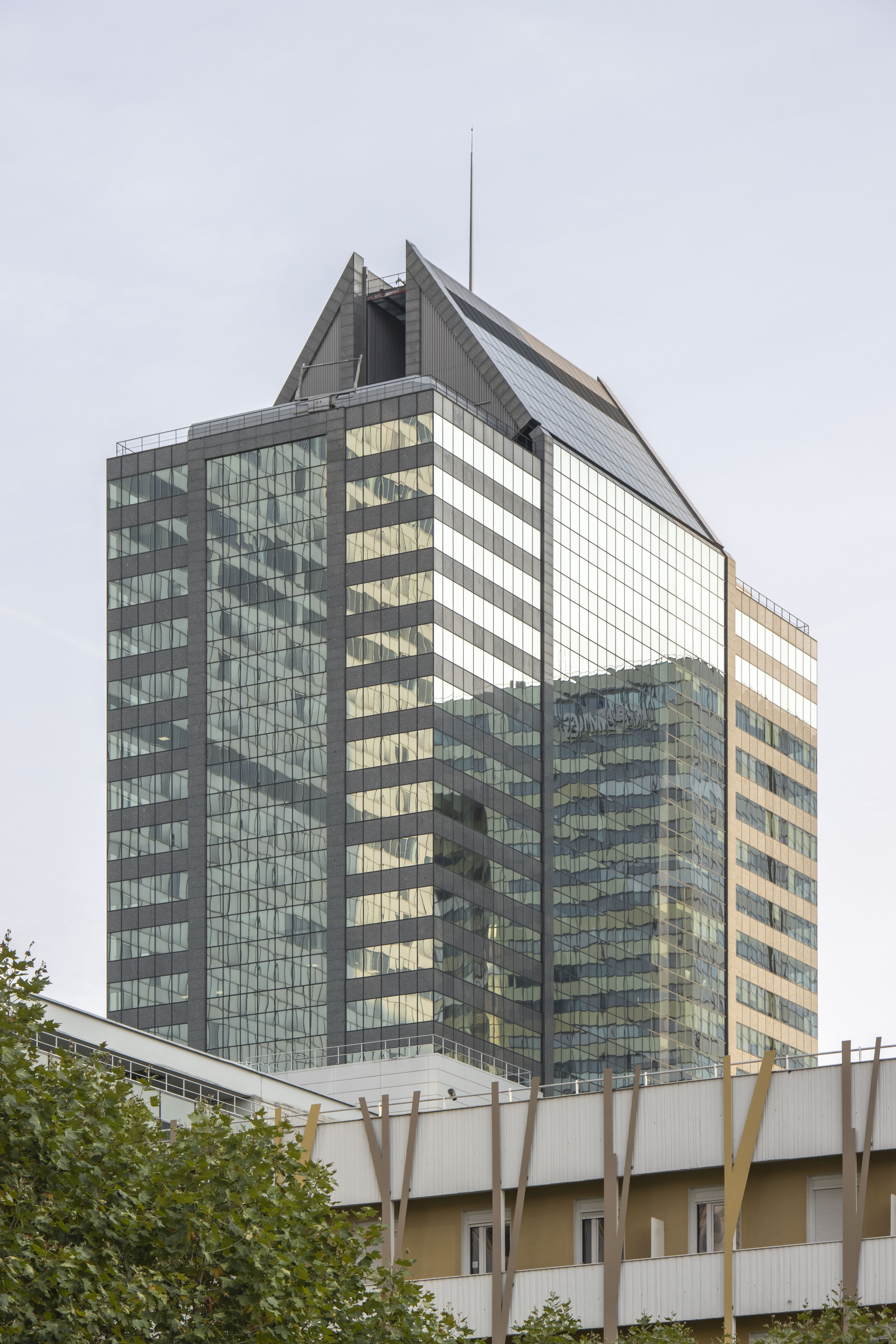
- Interactive map of the Tour Europlaza area

General information
- Type: Office
- Location: La Défense, Courbevoie, France
- Coordinates: 48°53′30″N 2°14′42″E
- Completed: 1972

Height
- Antenna spire: 135 m (443 ft)
- Roof: 135 m (443 ft)

Technical details
- Floor count: 31

Design and construction
- Architects: Jean-Pierre Dagbert, Michel Stenzel, Pierre Dufau

Tour Europlaza (previously known as tour Septentrion) is an office skyscraper located in La Défense business district situated west of Paris, France.

Built in 1972, the 135-metre (443 ft) tower belongs to the second generation of skyscrapers in La Défense. The tower distinguishes itself from the other towers of that period, thanks to a less boxy design and an original cladding. The tower was originally named Septentrion because of its northern location in the business district (Septentrion means North in French).

From 2019 on, the tower hosts the European Banking Authority which relocated from London following Brexit.

== See also ==
- List of tallest structures in Paris
