= Tour Trinity =

Office skyscraper in La Défense, Courbevoie, France

- Interactive map of the Tour Trinity area

General information
- Type: Office
- Architectural style: Modern
- Location: 1 bis, La Défense, Paris
- Coordinates: 48°53′34″N 2°14′28″E
- Construction started: 2016
- Completed: 2020

Height
- Roof: 157.2 m (516 ft)

Technical details
- Floor count: 33
- Floor area: 48,929 m^{2} (527,000 sq ft)

Design and construction
- Architects: Cro&Co Architecture
- Developer: Unibail-Rodamco-Westfield

Website
- Official website

Tour Trinity is an office skyscraper in the Courbevoie commune of the La Défense district in Paris. Built between 2016 and 2020, the tower stands at 157.2 m (516 ft) tall with 33 floors and is the 17th tallest building in Paris.

== History ==
The building was designed by the architecture firm Cro&Co Architecture, headed by French architect Jean-Luc Crochon. Its developer and promoter is Unibail-Rodamco-Westfield and its builder is Vinci SA.

The project by the real estate company Unibail-Rodamco-Westfield was accepted by Epadesa on March 5, 2012, and the building permit was issued on June 7 of the same year. Rodamco also managed the construction of the Tour Majunga in partnership with the Center of New Industries and Technologies (CNIT). Epadesa signed the deed of sale on October 26, 2015, and work on the tower began in early 2016 for a planned delivery in 2020.

The Trinity project benefits from a unique location. It sits above the traffic lanes (Avenue de la Division-Leclerc). It connects the CNIT and Coupole districts of La Défense via a 3,500 m^{2} (37,700 sq ft) landscaped plaza accessible to the public. The construction of public stairs and elevators will provide easy access to the plaza from street level.

The Trinity Tower comprises a two-level reception area (the Dome and the CNIT) and 33 floors, reaching a height of 140 meters from the slab, or 151 meters from the natural ground level on its west facade, and 167 meters including the spire. The average office floor area is 1,600 m^{2} (17,200 sq ft) (usable floor area), for a total area of 48,929 m^{2} (527,000 sq ft) (including the shared corporate restaurant).

=== Architecture ===
The Cro&Co Architecture agency, which designed the architecture of the Trinity Tower, envisioned it as an urban link between La Défense and Courbevoie by creating a total of 3,500 m^{2} (37,700 sq ft) of public spaces connecting the esplanade of La Défense to the Coupole slab and to the avenue de la Division Leclerc.

The Trinity tower is aiming for HQE “exceptional” certification (the first office tower in France to reach the “very high performance” level on all 14 targets) and BREEAM “excellent”.

Trinity incorporates several architectural innovations:

An off-center core: Trinity's core is offset on the facade and enhanced with panoramic elevators. Outdoor spaces: tree-lined terraces, loggias and balconies are accessible along the entire height of the tower. Openings in the facade, which allow access to the open air on all facades. Bioclimatic facades that optimize the intake of natural light. A minimum clear height of 2.80 m on all floors. The landscape architect for the operation is Bas Smets.

=== Investments ===
After the delivery of the Trinity tower in 2021, Unibail-Rodamco-Westfield, the tower's owner, moved its headquarters there. ENDMarch 2023The tower is 82% occupied. The occupants, besides Unibail-Rodamco-Westfield, are Covage, Altitude Infra, Linkt, Technip, Sopra Steria, Afflelou and Welkin & Meraki. END2024, Unibail-Rodamco-Westfield sells 80% of its shares in the tower to the Norwegian sovereign wealth fund Norges Bank Investment Management.

== Miscellansous ==
On Sunday, January 17, 2021, three-time world vice-champion of mountain bike trials, Aurélien Fontenoy, climbed the 33 floors of the Trinity Tower via the stairs. This sporting achievement was closely followed by around thirty journalists, as well as by a young boy named Noah, who, thanks to the Rêves association, was able to meet Aurélien Fontenoy. The feat was also followed by Riding Zone, who made a video on their YouTube channel retracing this sporting achievement.

== Construction site chronology ==
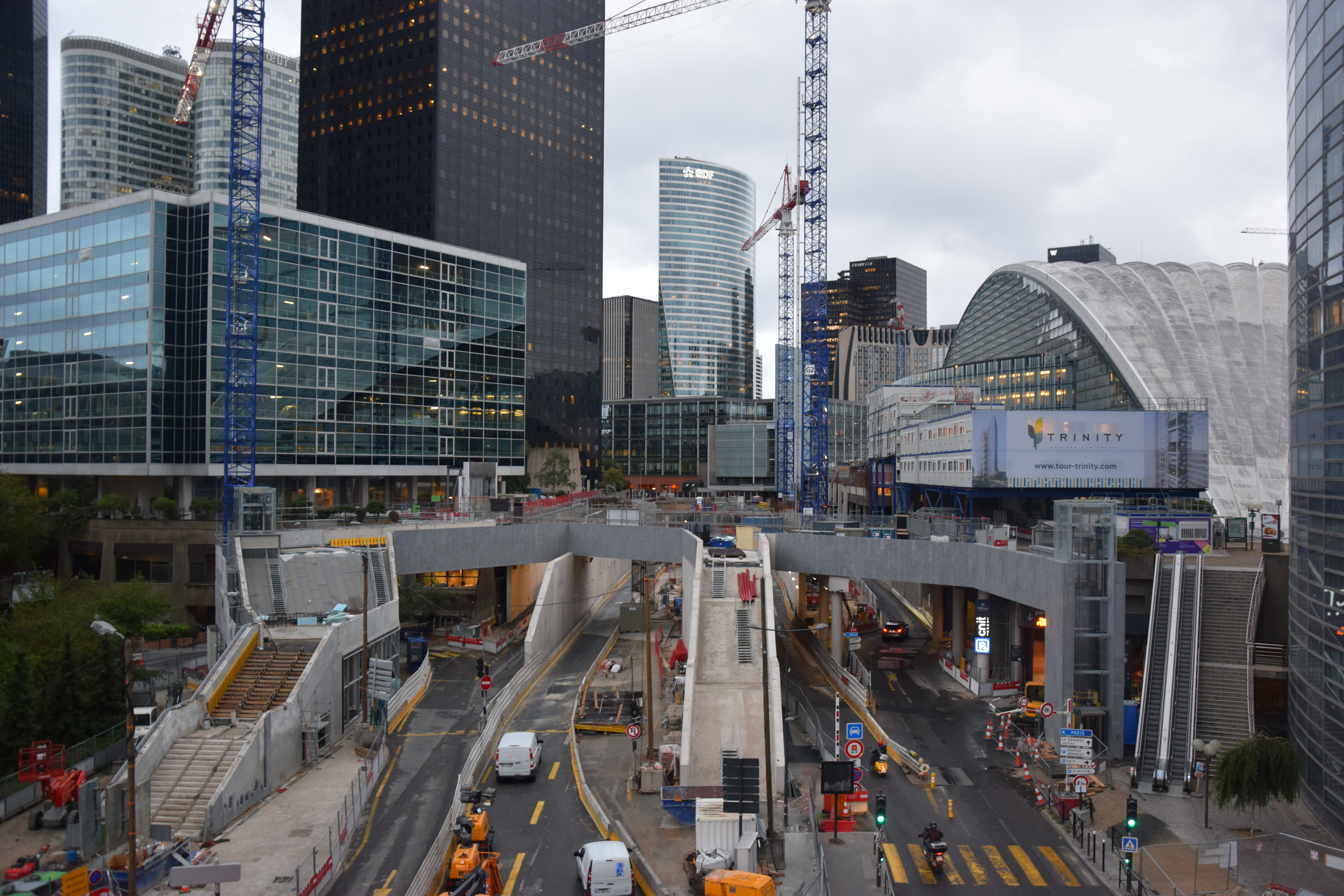
August 2017

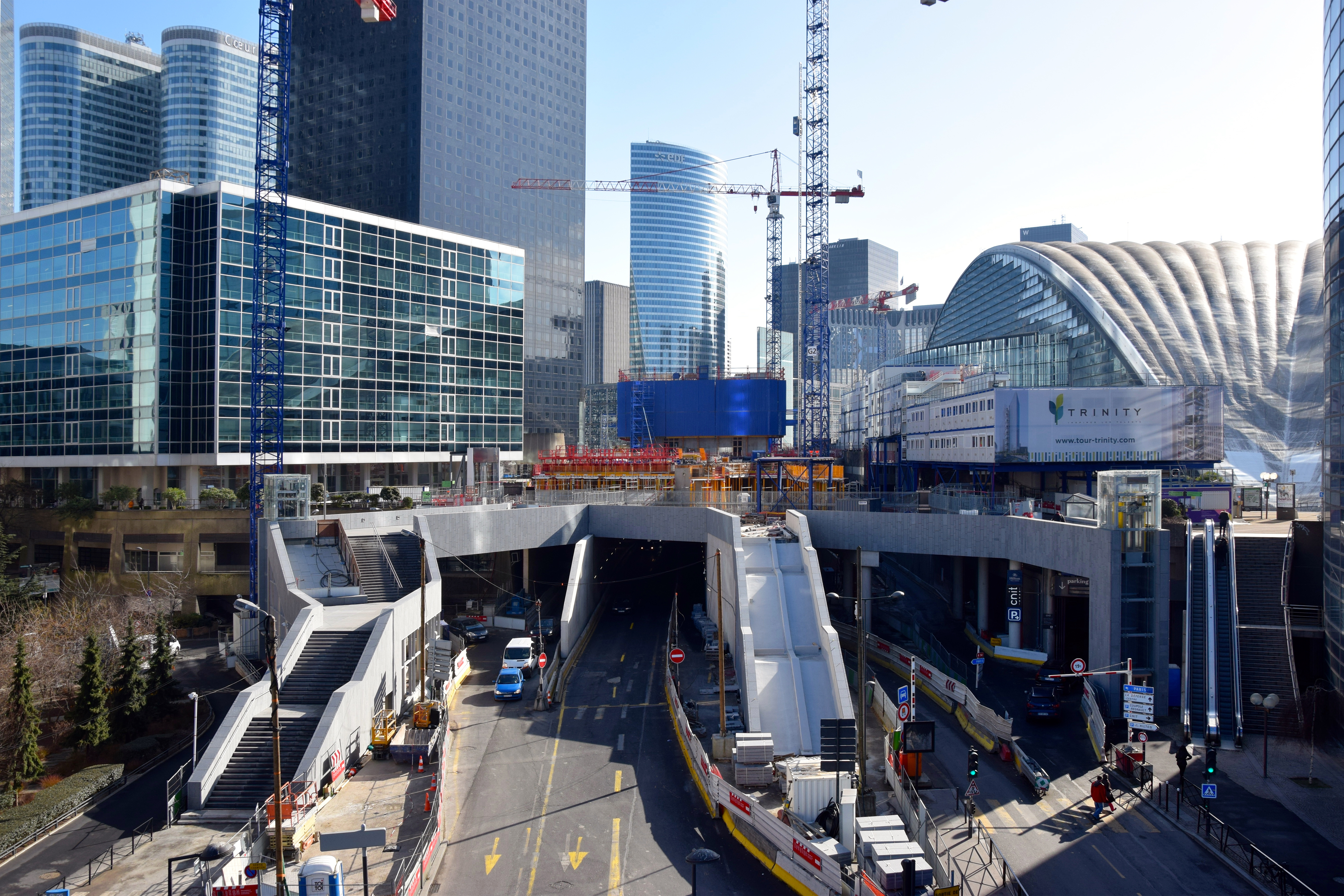
March 2018

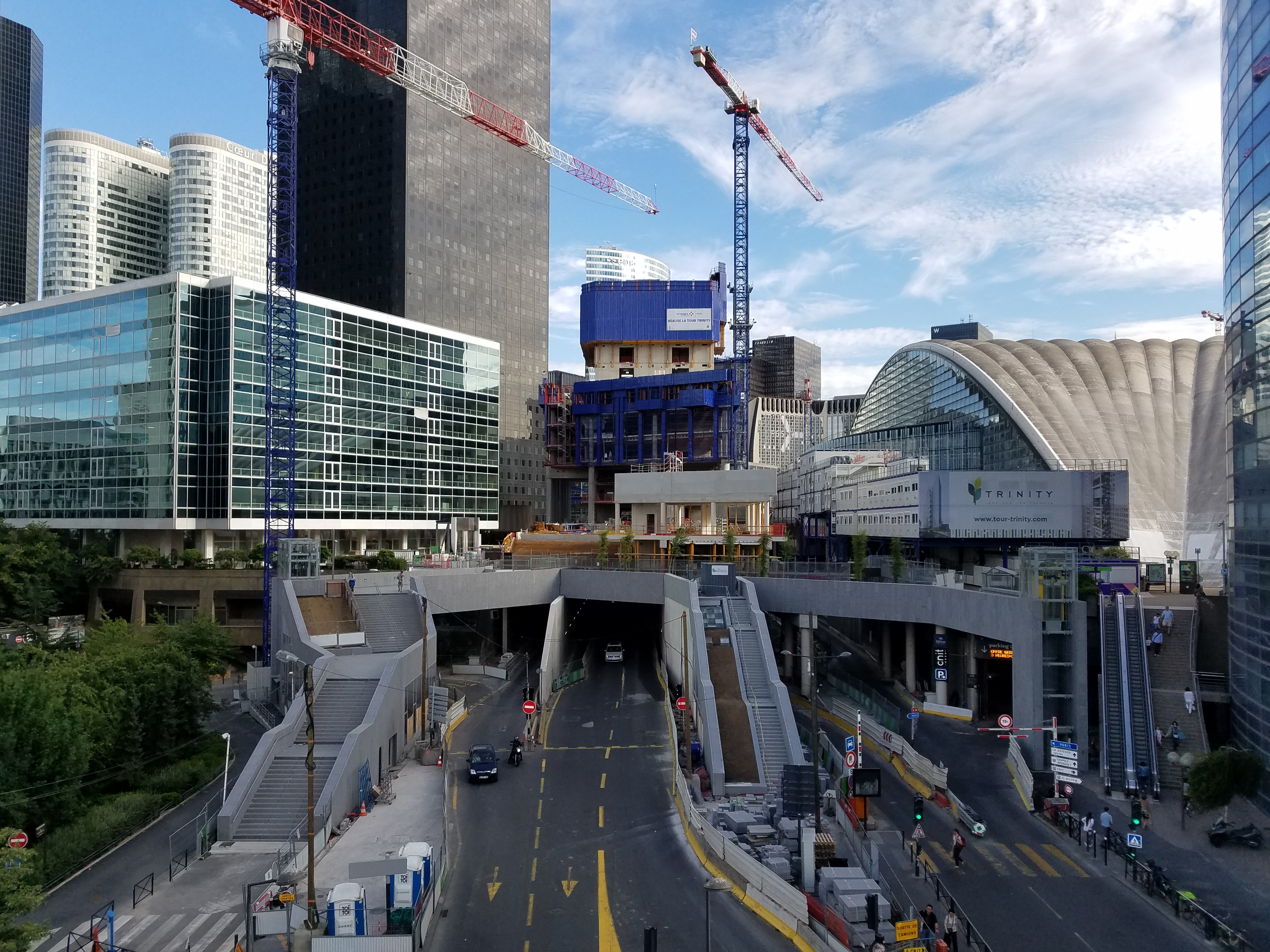
June 2018

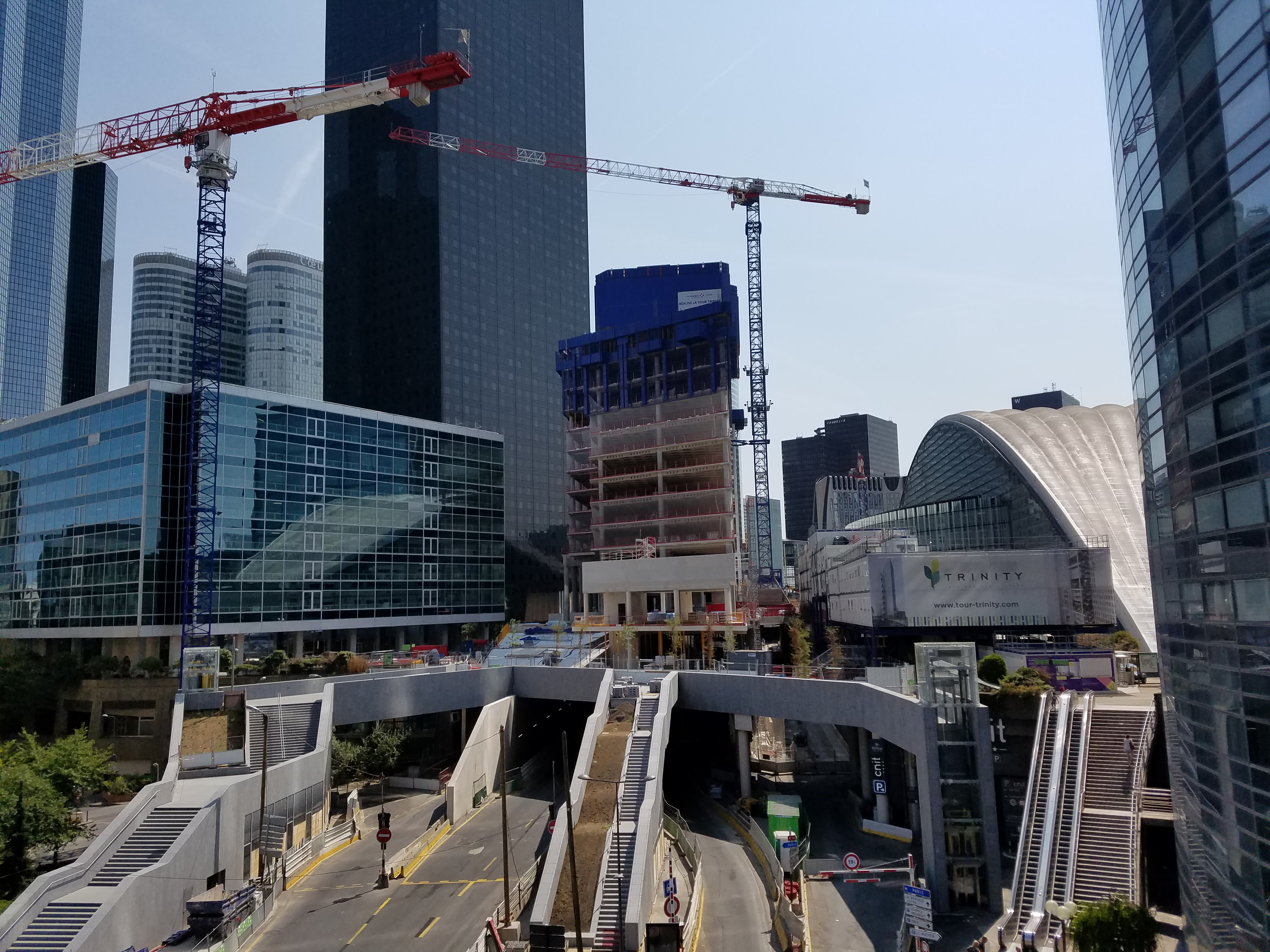
August 2018

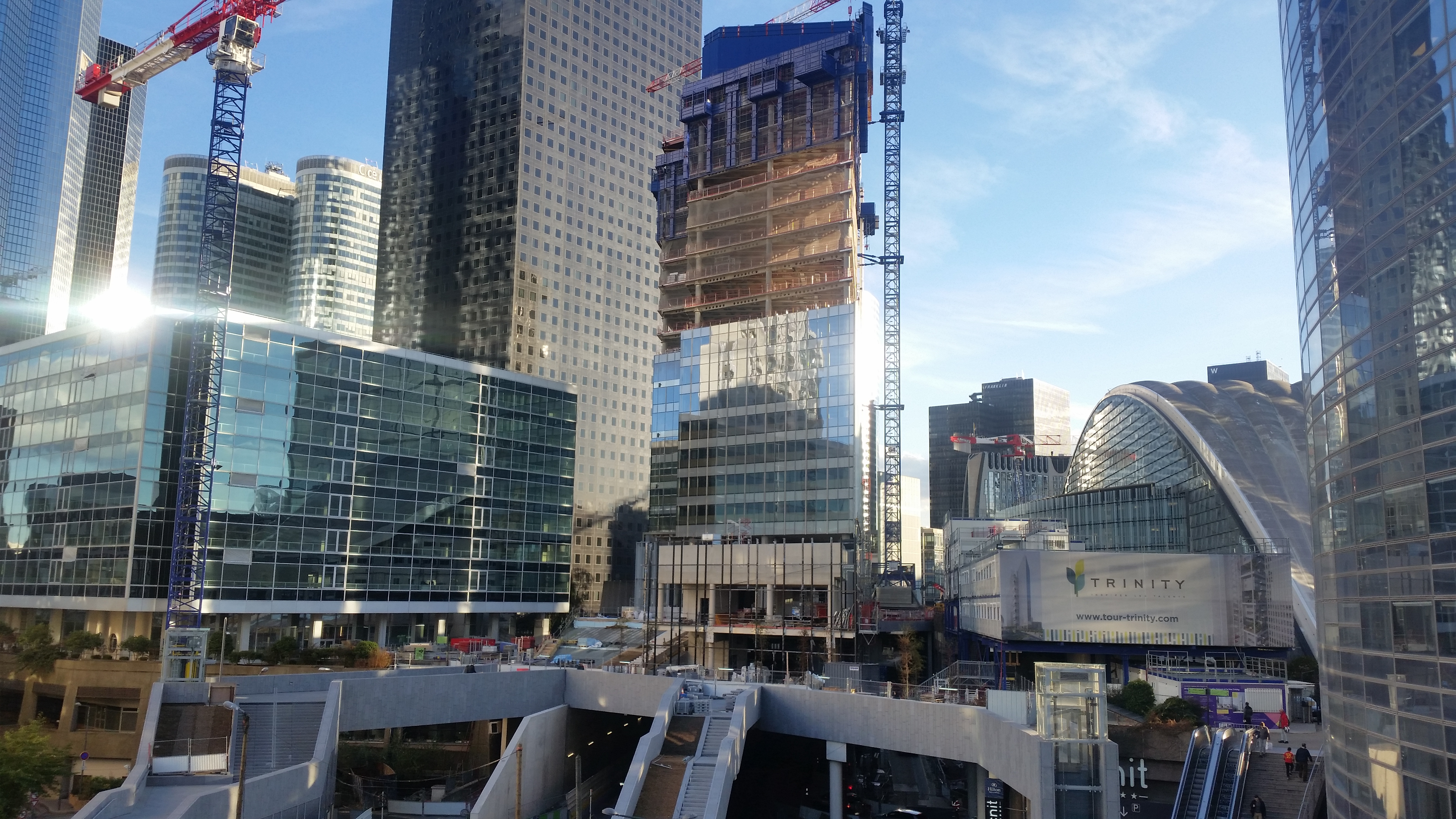
November 2018

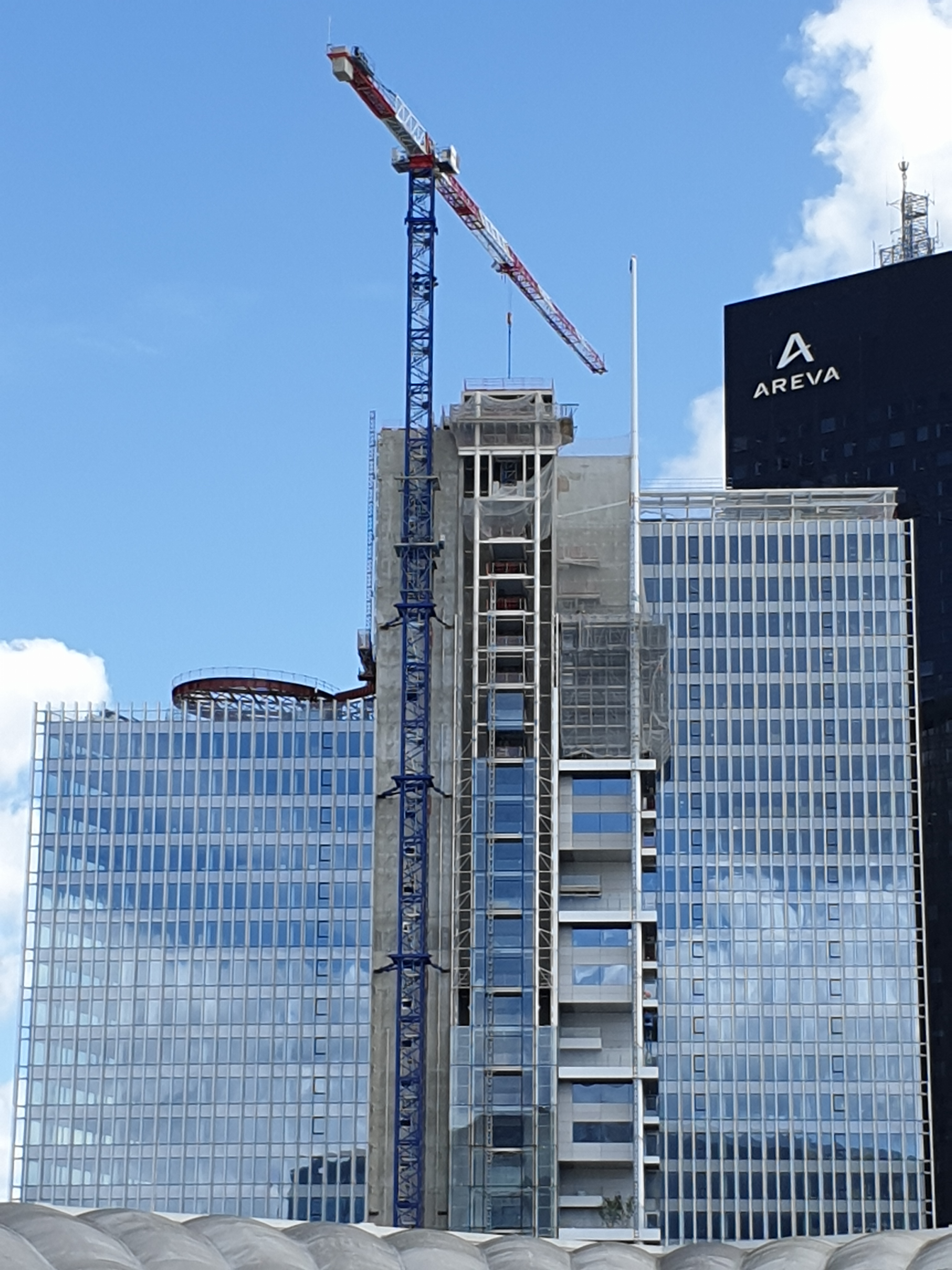
August 2019

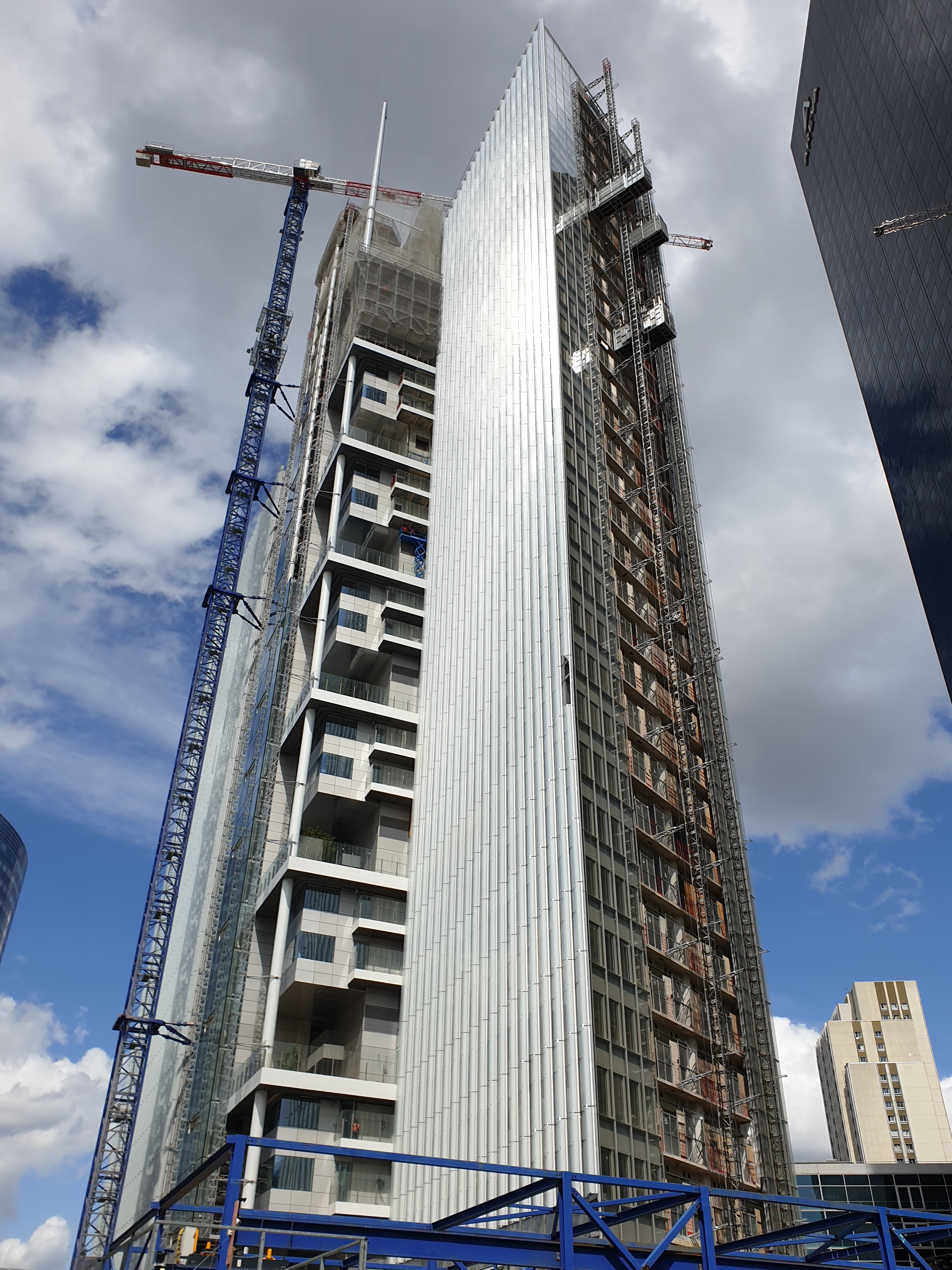
August 2019

== See also ==
- List of tallest buildings in France
- List of tallest buildings and structures in the Paris region
