= Orgues de Flandre =

Residential buildings in Paris, France

Coordinates: 48°53′24″N 02°22′24″E

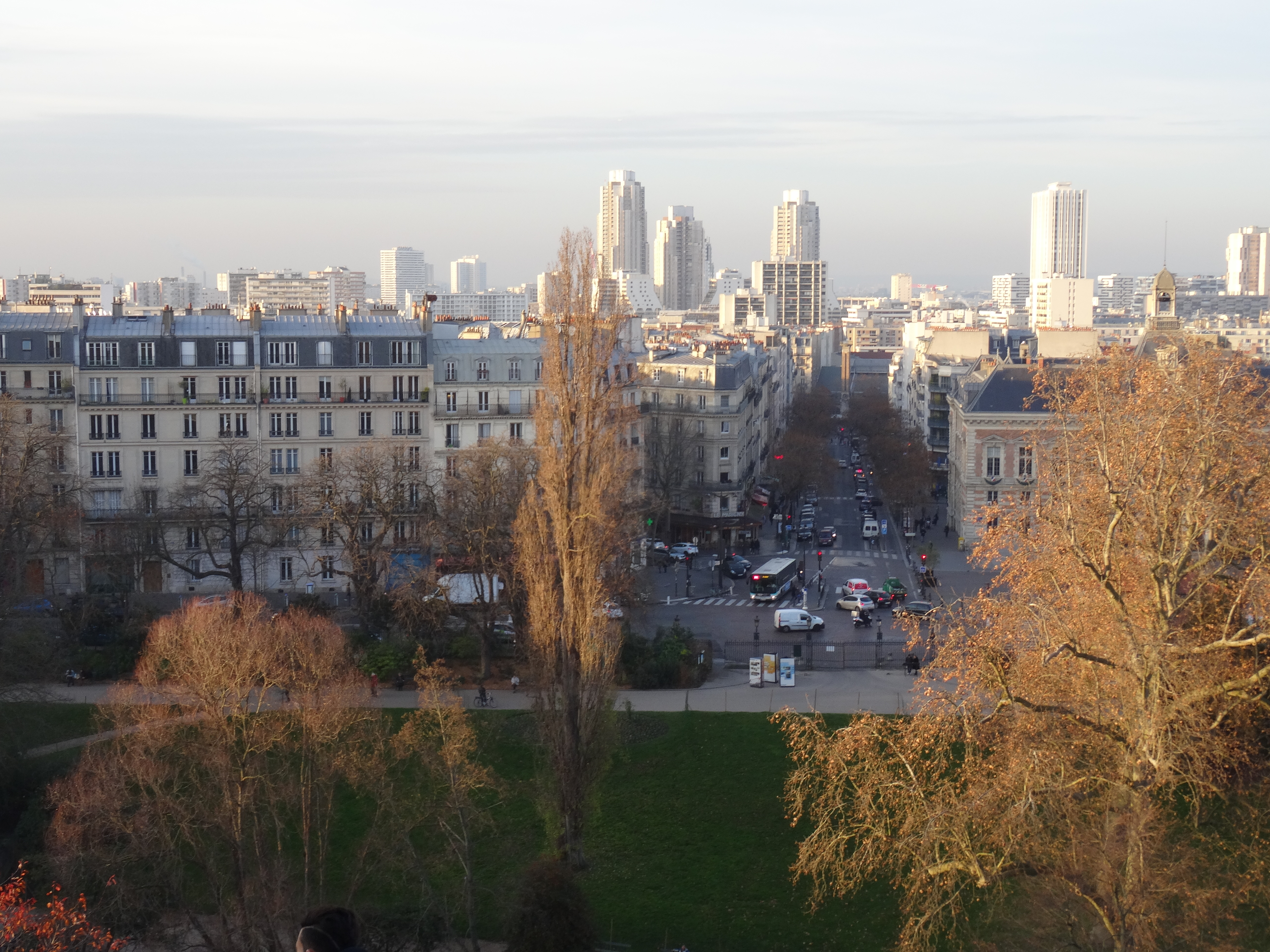
Orgues de Flandre in the background

The Orgues de Flandre, which can be translated as the "Organs of Flanders", are a group of residential buildings in the 19th arrondissement of Paris, France.

Built from 1974 to 1980 by the architect Martin van Trek, the buildings are at 67-107 avenue de Flandre and 14-24 rue Archereau. The buildings are a housing project of 6 ha (15 acres), made of many buildings of 15 floors and four dominating towers:

- Tour Prélude (or Tower 1): 123 m (404 ft), 38 floors
- Tour Fugue (or Tower 2): 108 m (354 ft), 32 floors
- Tour Cantate (or Tower 3): 123 m (404 ft), 30 floors
- Tour Sonate (or Tower 4): 90 m (300 ft), 25 floors

== See also ==
- Skyscraper
- List of tallest structures in Paris
- List of Brutalist structures
