= Tour Les Poissons =

42-storey skyscraper in Courbevoie, near La Défense business district, Paris, France

- Interactive map of the Tour Les Poissons area

General information
- Status: Completed
- Type: Commercial offices condominiums
- Architectural style: Modernism
- Location: 20 Ter rue de Bezons; Courbevoie, France
- Coordinates: 48.8944°N 2.25167°E
- Completed: 1970

Height
- Antenna spire: 150 m (490 ft)
- Roof: 129.5 m (425 ft)

Technical details
- Floor count: 42

Design and construction
- Architect: Henry Pottier
- Main contractor: Entreprise Oger

Tour Les Poissons, known in corporate real estate as Tour Ciel, is a 42-storey, 129.5 m (425 ft) skyscraper located west of Paris in Courbevoie, Hauts-de-Seine, France. While often grouped with the many office towers of La Défense business district, it is actually located half a mile to the northeast in a smaller mixed use complex called Centre Charras, of which it remains the highest building.

Completed in 1970, it has occasionally been described as France's first true skyscraper, although Tour Perret in Amiens is more frequently cited. Between its inauguration and that of Tour Montparnasse in 1973, Tour Les Poissons was France's highest building designed for occupancy (which excludes antennas or observation towers such as the Eiffel Tower).

== Design ==
The French word "poisson" means fish, but it is also used—as is the case here—for the astrological sign Pisces. Tour Poissons was built as part of an ensemble called Zodiaque, whose residential buildings were inspired, in name and in some cases design, by signs of the zodiac. The design of Tour Les Poissons includes a white tower joined with a smaller black tower. Together, they are supposed to evoke the motif of two interlocked fishes traditionally associated with the Pisces sign.

It was envisioned strictly as a housing tower, but security regulations of the time capped the number of floors that could be used for residential purposes to thirty, so the rest was converted to offices. The first two floors, as well as the upper ten, hold a medical center and various corporate offices. The intermediate floors hold residential apartments. The upper office floors are recognizable thanks to their larger windows.

The building used to be topped by a spire, in the form of a 22 m (72 ft) cylindrical concrete barometer that glowed green or blue to indicate atmospheric pressure. It was removed in October 2006.

== Renovation and rebrand ==
Following the departure of longtime owner and occupant Axa, the office floors within the building were renovated in 2007–08 by new owners Westbrook Investments and architect Xavier Sterlin. The renovated space was reintroduced to the market under the upscale name "Tour Ciel" (English: Sky Tower), in an attempt to align its image with the skyscrapers of the more prestigious La Défense district. The residential section retained the "Tour Poissons" moniker.

Among its tenants—as of 2022—are the French headquarters of TÜV Rheinland and Borealis, as well as the Ecole supérieure de l'immobilier (English: Superior School of Real Estate).

== UAP/AXA Towers ==
Between 1970 and 2006, Tour Les Poissons' façade bore a large sign for insurance company UAP (later Axa), which co-developed the Zodiaque project in a public–private partnership with the city of Courbevoie, and stored its computer servers on the tower's office floors. For this reason, Tour Les Poissons came to be known as Tour UAP or Tour Axa in the Charras neighborhood, although that was not its official name. Internally at UAP, Les Poissons was simply called Tour Charras.

In 1970, UAP commissioned architect Pierre Dufau to build a second, taller skyscraper based on the same structural design at La Défense, which opened in 1974 under the name Tour Assur. It became UAP's main headquarters, and therefore the building most widely associated with the names Tour UAP and Tour AXA.

Between 1972 and 1994, there was yet another Tour UAP in the La Part-Dieu district of Lyon, but it was vacated in 1994 and razed in 2010 to be replaced with Tour Incity.

== See also ==
- La Défense
- List of tallest structures in Paris
