= Tour Alto =

Office skyscraper in La Défense, Courbevoie, France

- Interactive map of the Tour Alto area

General information
- Type: Office
- Location: Courbevoie, La Défense, Paris
- Coordinates: 48°53′22″N 2°15′05″E
- Construction started: 2017
- Completed: 2020

Height
- Roof: 160 m (525 ft)

Technical details
- Floor count: 38
- Floor area: 51,200 m^{2} (551,000 sq ft)

Design and construction
- Architects: SRA architectes & IF Architectes
- Developer: Epadesa
- Main contractor: Bouygues Batiment International

Website
- Official website

Tour Alto is an office skyscraper in the Courbevoie commune of the La Défense district in Paris. Built between 2017 and 2020, the tower stands at 160 m (525 ft) tall with 38 floors and is the 21st tallest building in Paris.

== History ==
The Alto Tower is a project financed by SCI White Tower. Development, design, and construction are being handled by Bouygues Construction, in partnership with Linkcity, the real estate development arm of the same group. The architectural design was conceived by IF Architectes and developed in association with SRA Architectes.

The work began in September 2016 and was completed in the first half of 2020. The first steps were the demolition of the existing Saisons building, erected in 1993. and the construction of an underground parking lot, supporting the future forecourt of the Alto Tower.

It measures 160 meters from street level and 150 meters from the La Défense plaza on its eastern façade alone, for a total of 38 floors above ground and 3 underground levels. Its rounded shape gradually widens towards the top with a 12 cm offset outwards. Thanks to this shape, the floor area increases from 700 m^{2} at the base of the tower to 1,500 m^{2} at the top. There are two terraces on floors 36 and 37 providing almost 340m² of outdoors space.

From an urban planning perspective, this tower fits perfectly into the revitalization of the circular boulevard desired by the public establishment Paris La Défense.

The main companies involved in the building's project were Developer: Paris La Défense Investor: SCI White Tower Developer: Linkcity Designer and builder (project management agent): Bouygues Bâtiment Île-de-France (Private Construction subsidiary) Architects: IF Architects & SRA Architects.

== Gallery ==
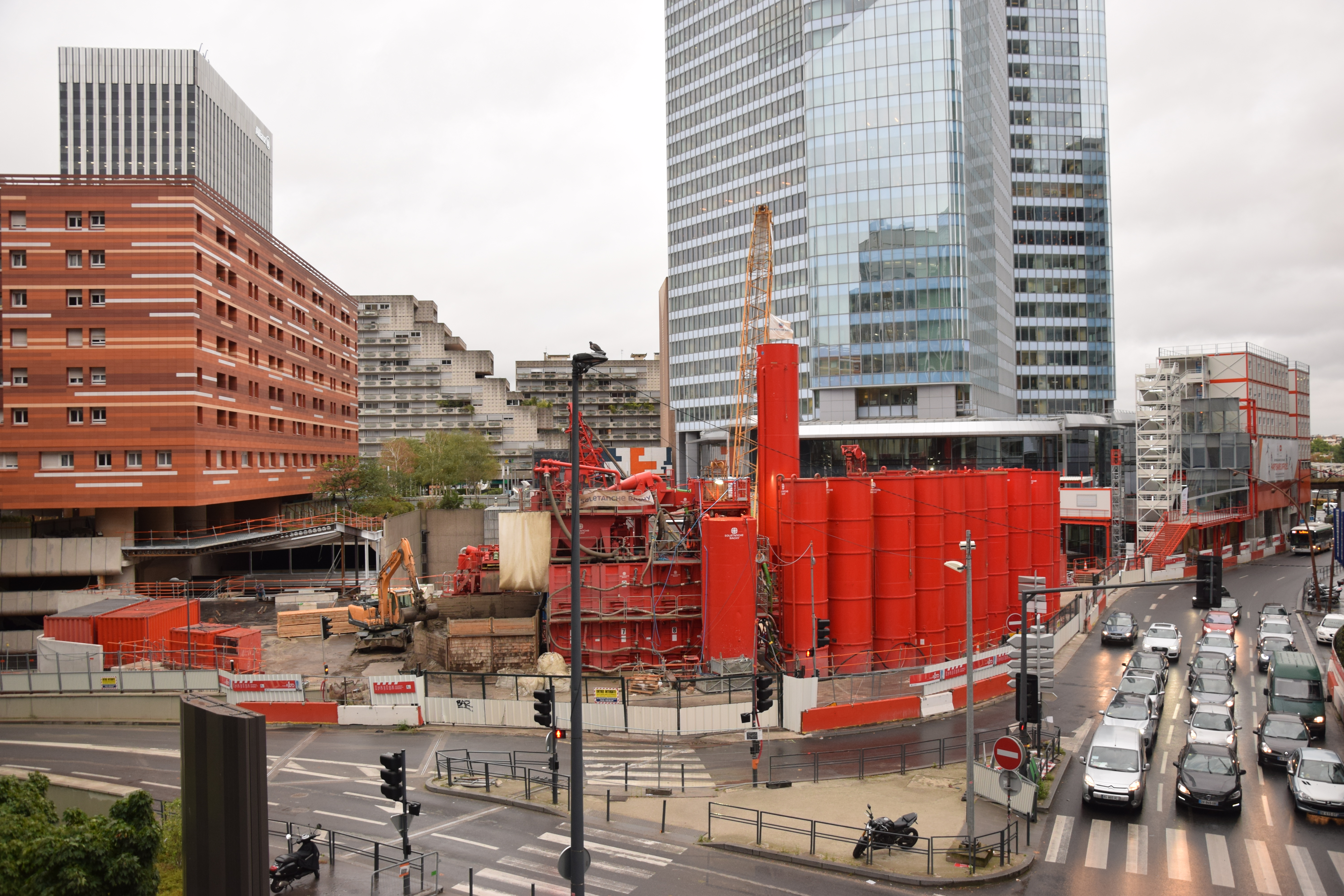
The tower under construction in August 2017...

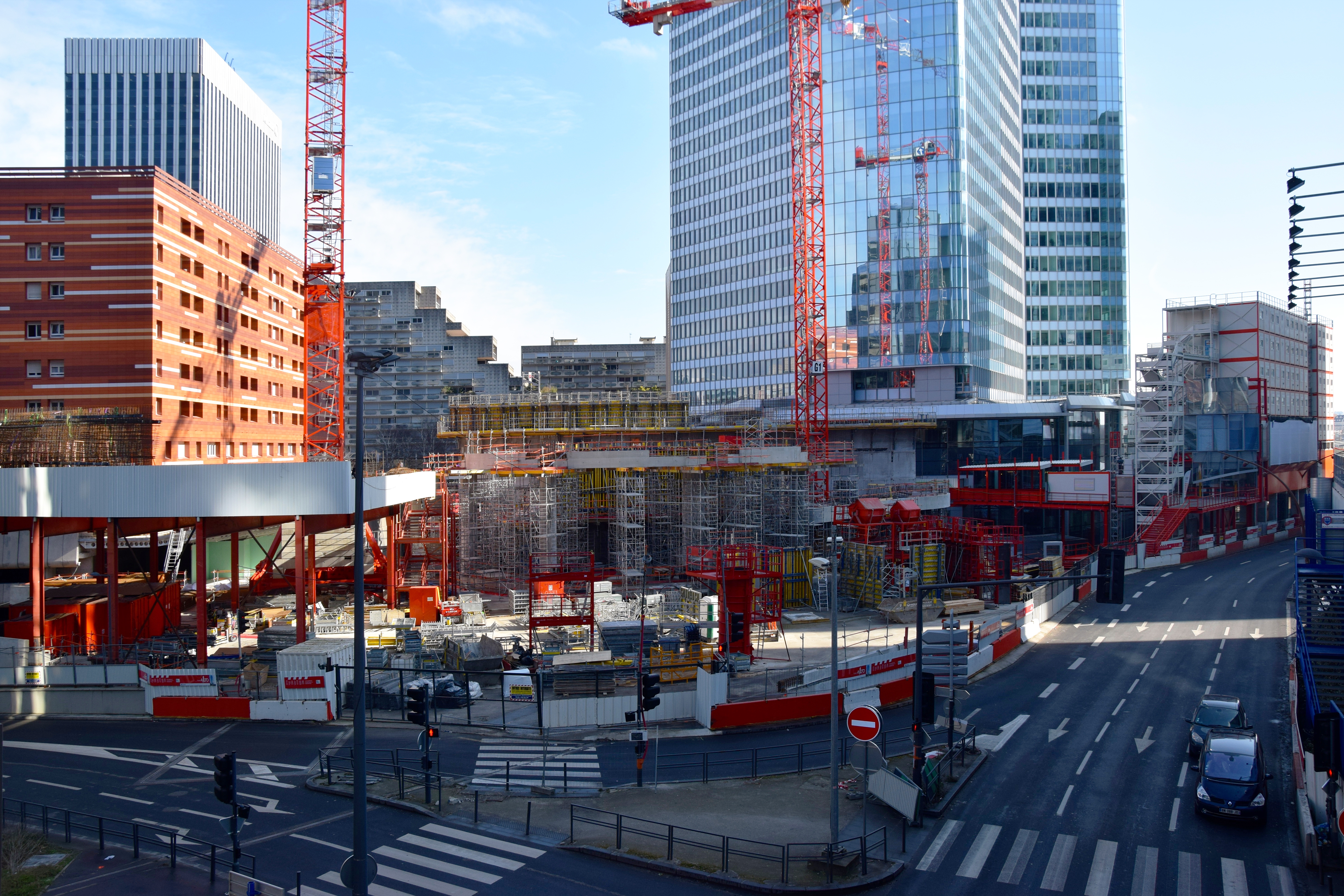
March 2018...

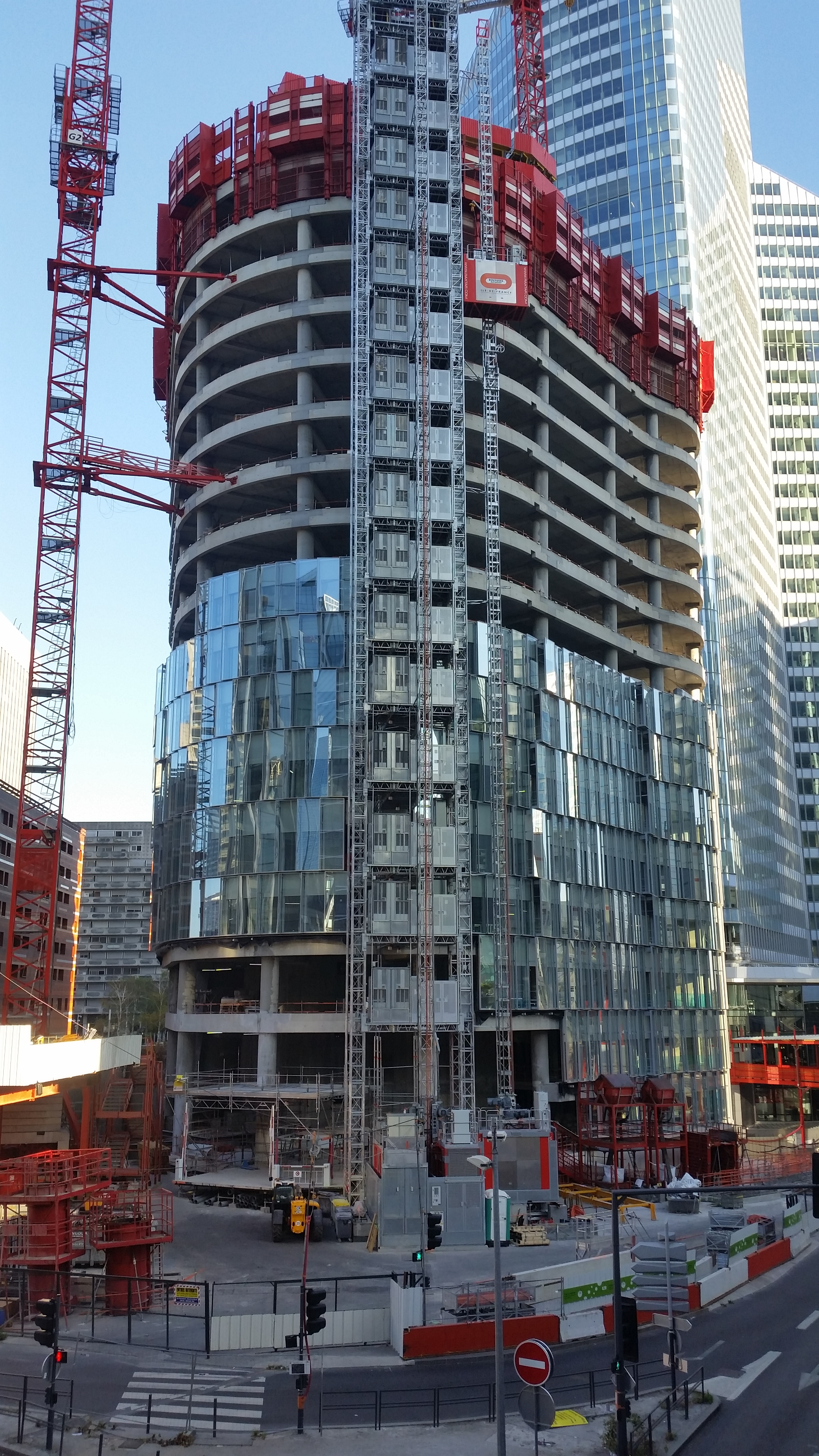
...and October 2018

== See also ==
- List of tallest buildings in France
- List of tallest buildings and structures in the Paris region
