= Tour Défense 2000 =

- Tour Défense 2000 in 2024
- Interactive map of the Tour Défense 2000 area

General information
- Type: Dwelling
- Location: La Défense (Puteaux)
- Coordinates: 48°53′15″N 2°14′12″E
- Completed: 1974

Height
- Antenna spire: 134 m (440 ft)

Technical details
- Floor count: 47

Design and construction
- Architects: Proux, Demones, Srot

The Tour Défense 2000 is one of the tallest residential buildings in France. The tower is situated in the La Défense section of Puteaux, a suburb of Paris.

The tower was constructed between April 1971 and November 1974. Its success as a residence was not immediate: two years into its opening only a quarter of its apartments had been sold. In comparison to the other buildings of La Défense, Tour Défense 2000 is relatively isolated, and thus benefits from a beautiful panoramic view.

In total, there are 370 apartments occupying 47 floors, and the building is capable of housing about 700 people. Apartments range in size from 19m² to 140m².

== See also ==
Tour Défense 2000 in 2006

- Skyscraper
- List of tallest structures in Paris
