= Tour T1 =

Office skyscraper in La Défense, France

General information
- Status: Completed
- Type: Office
- Location: La Défense (Courbevoie)
- Coordinates: 48°53′46″N 2°14′22″E
- Construction started: 2005
- Completed: 2008
- Opening: 2008

Height
- Antenna spire: 185 m (607 ft)
- Roof: 169 m (554 ft)

Technical details
- Floor count: 37
- Floor area: 70,000 m^{2} (750,000 sq ft)

Design and construction
- Architect: Valode & Pistre Architects

Tour T1 (also known as the Tour GDF Suez) is an office skyscraper in La Défense, the high-rise business district west of Paris, France.

Construction began in 2005 and the tower was completed and opened in 2008. The tower, 185 m (607 ft) tall, is the sixth-tallest skyscraper in La Défense. Since 2010, the entirety of the building's office space has been rented by GDF Suez.

== See also ==
- Skyscraper
- La Défense
- List of tallest structures in Paris
