= Pierre Dufau =

French architect (1908–1985)

Pierre Dufau (21 June 1908 – 26 September 1985) was a French architect.

He is particularly known for his work on the reconstruction of Amiens after World War II, and the Tour Europlaza in Paris. He also designed numerous NATO air bases between 1951-1955.
