= Cœur Défense =

Office skyscraper in La Défense, Courbevoie, France

- Cœur Défense
- Interactive map of the Cœur Défense area

General information
- Type: Office
- Location: La Défense (Courbevoie)
- Coordinates: 48°53′26.60″N 2°14′38.90″E
- Completed: 2001

Height
- Antenna spire: 161 m (528 ft)
- Roof: 161 m (528 ft)

Technical details
- Floor count: 40
- Floor area: 350,000 m^{2} (3,770,000 sq ft)

Design and construction
- Architect: Jean-Paul Viguier

Website
- www.coeurdefense.com

Cœur Défense is an office skyscraper in La Défense, the high-rise business district west of Paris, France. With 350,000 m^{2} (3.77 million sq. ft), it is the building with the most floor space in Europe along with the Palace of Parliament in Bucharest.

Coeur Défense was built in 2001, replacing the former Esso Tower, the first building of the old generation to be destroyed in La Défense. Cœur Défense is a large complex made of two main bodies connected to one another by a smaller body and seating on a wide basis made of several smaller bodies. The edges of all bodies are rounded. The cladding is white, with large windows. An electronic system monitors white blinds which can be drawn or opened all together at the same time.

The two main bodies are 161 m (528 ft) tall each. Both of them are relatively thin as their width is only 24 m (79 ft), and they are out of line with each other, so that sunlight can reach all parts of the building.

Lehman Brothers' €2.1bn top-of-the-market purchase of Coeur Défense, was expected to become Europe's largest distressed property sale. Due to falling property values, and the bankruptcy of Lehman Brothers, the transaction was under stress. The borrower who owns the building, Heart of La Défense, had placed itself under sauvegarde .

== See also ==
- Skyscraper
- La Défense
- List of tallest structures in Paris
- World's largest buildings
