= Tour Franklin =

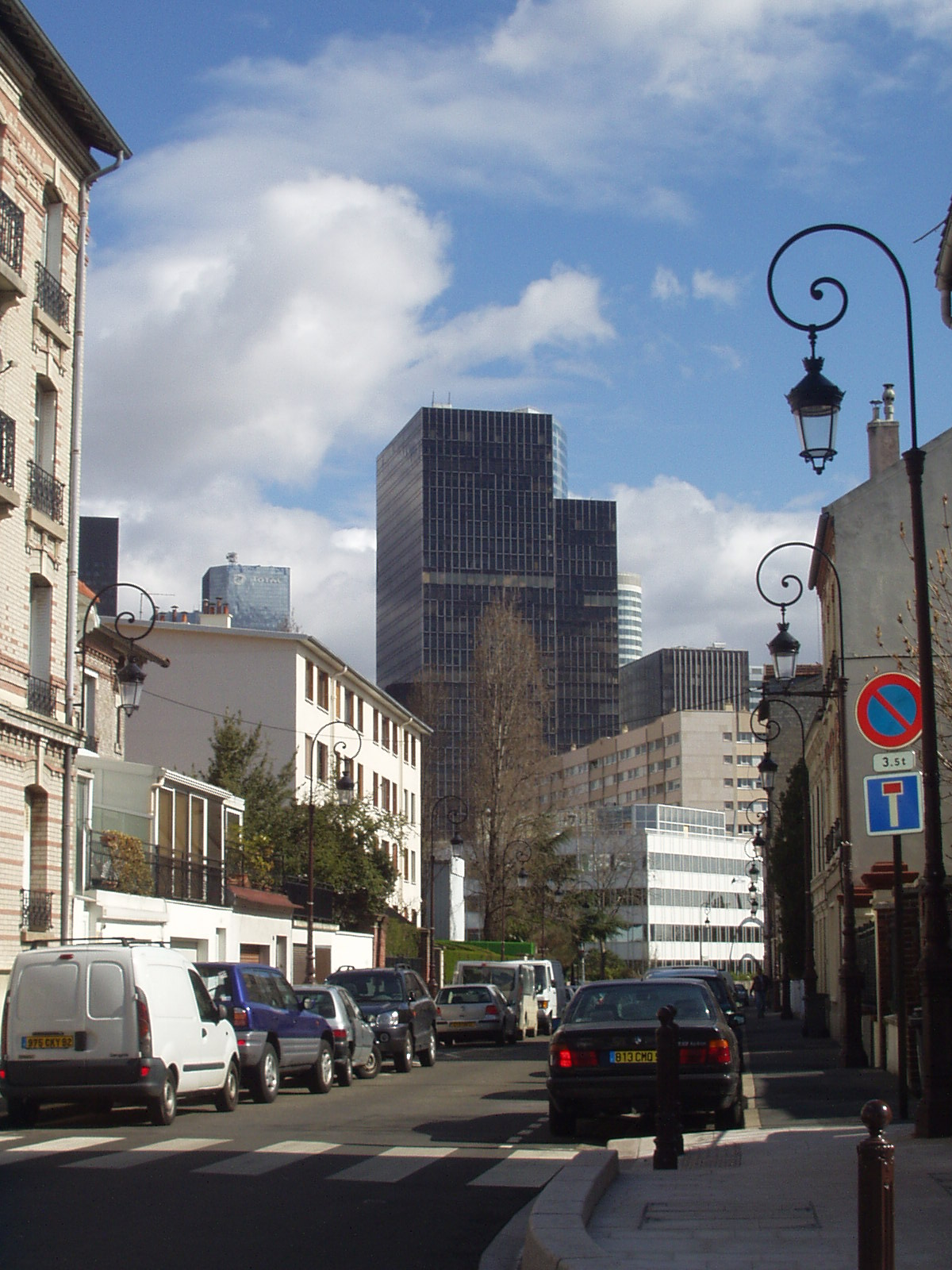
- Tour Franklin
- Interactive map of the Tour Franklin area

General information
- Type: Office
- Location: La Défense (Puteaux)
- Coordinates: 48°53′21″N 2°14′25″E
- Completed: 1972

Height
- Antenna spire: 120 m (390 ft)
- Roof: 120 m (390 ft)

Technical details
- Floor count: 33
- Floor area: 72,500 m^{2} (780,000 sq ft)

Design and construction
- Architects: Delb, Chesnau, Verola, Lalande

Tour Franklin is an office skyscraper located in La Défense business district situated west of Paris, France.

Built in 1972, the tower of 114.7 metres of height belongs to the second generation of skyscrapers in La Défense. Its design consists of the merger of a smaller tower in a larger one.

== See also ==
- Skyscraper
- La Défense
- List of tallest structures in Paris
