= Tour Areva =

Office skyscraper in Paris

- Tour Areva (Formerly Tour Fiat) La Défense
- Interactive map of the Tour Areva area

General information
- Type: Office
- Location: La Défense (Courbevoie)
- Coordinates: 48°53′32″N 2°14′31″E
- Construction started: 1972
- Completed: 1974

Height
- Roof: 178 m (584 ft)

Technical details
- Floor count: 44
- Floor area: 102,500 m^{2} (1,103,000 sq ft)

Design and construction
- Architects: Skidmore, Owings & Merrill (SOM); Roger Saubot, Francois Jullien

Website
- www.parisladefense.com/en/district/towers-buildings/areva

Tour Areva (previously known as Tour Framatome and Tour Fiat) is an office skyscraper designed by global architects SOM and located in La Défense, a high-rise business district, and in the commune of Courbevoie, France, west of Paris.

Built in 1974, the tower is 178 m (584 ft) tall.

Tour Areva is entirely black; its cladding is made of dark granite and darkened windows. Its shape is that of a perfect square prism. It is said that its architects were inspired by the black monolith in Stanley Kubrick's film 2001: A Space Odyssey.

The site where the tower was built was codenamed CB1 in La Défense initial master plan. A twin tower of Tour Areva was initially planned at the current location of the Tour Total, but was cancelled due to the 1973 oil crisis.

== See also ==
- List of tallest buildings and structures in the Paris region
