= Tour Landscape =

- Former names: Tour Pascal; Tour IBM Europe; Tour DDA

General information
- Status: Completed
- Type: Commercial offices
- Architectural style: Modernism
- Location: 6 place des degrés La Défense, Courbevoie, France
- Coordinates: 48.8895782°N 2.2358243°E
- Completed: 1983
- Renovated: 2021

Height
- Antenna spire: 101 m (331 ft)
- Roof: 101 m (331 ft)

Technical details
- Floor count: 28
- Floor area: 64,000 m^{2} (690,000 sq ft)

Design and construction
- Architects: Henri de la Fonta; Dominique Perrault

The Tour Landscape (formerly IBM Europe tower, Pascal tower and DDE tower) is an office skyscraper located in the business district of La Défense, and precisely Place des Degres, Puteaux. In 2017, a modernization project is announced that will see the merger of the two towers (Tours Pascal) and the total height increased to 101 meters. The restructuring project started in the summer of 2017 with the new name Tour Landscape.
