= Tour Pleyel =

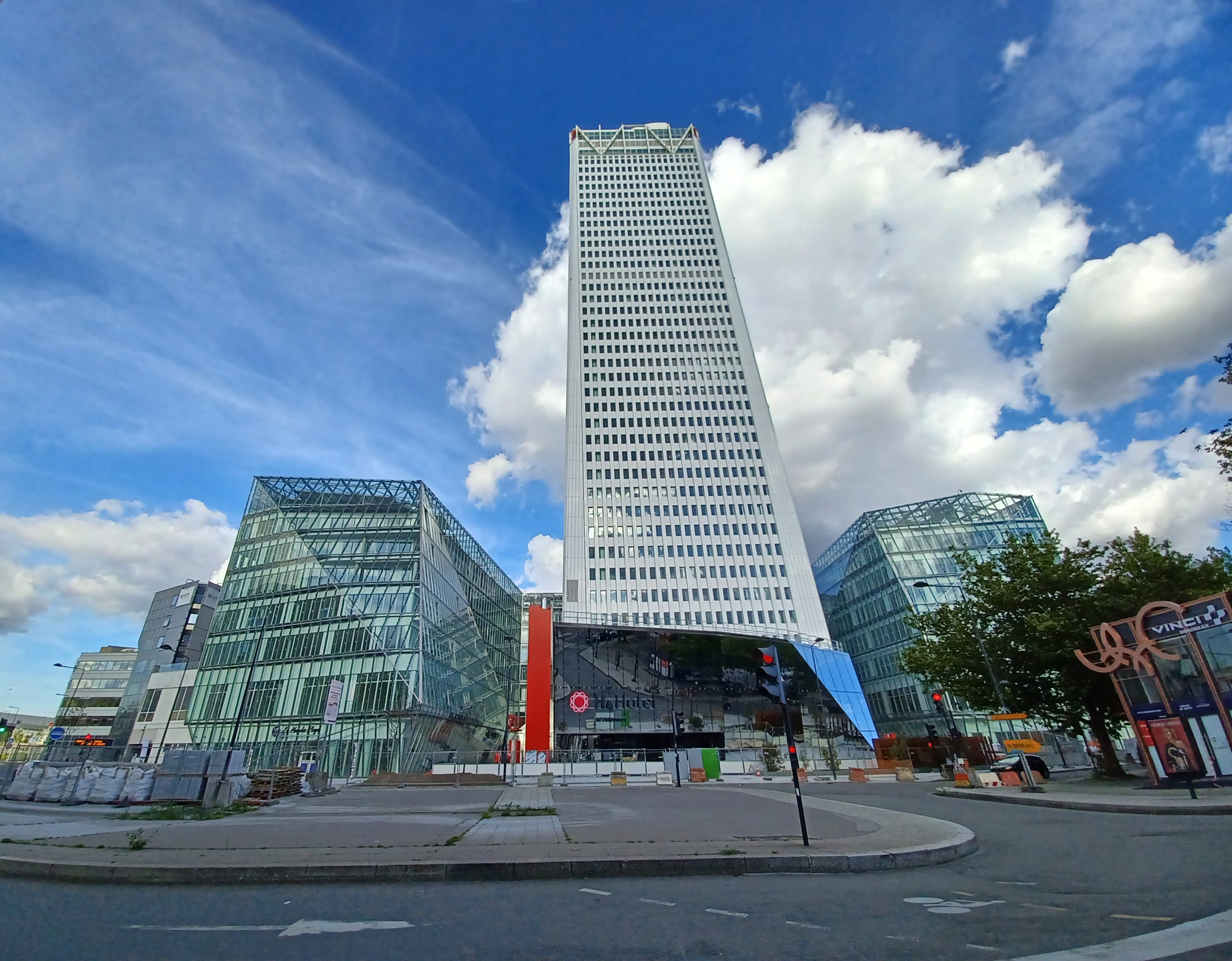

- Location within France

Record height
- Tallest in Saint-Denis since 1973^{[I]}

General information
- Status: Completed
- Type: Mixed use
- Architectural style: Modern
- Location: 153 Boulevard Anatole France, Saint-Denis, France
- Coordinates: 48°55′12″N 02°20′42″E
- Completed: 1973
- Renovated: 2017

Height
- Tip: 143 m (469 ft)
- Roof: 129 m (423 ft)

Technical details
- Material: Concrete
- Floor count: 39

Design and construction
- Architect: Michel Folliasson

Tour Pleyel is a skyscraper of mixed use, both residential and commercial, located in the commune of Saint-Denis in the suburbs of Paris, France.

Built in 1972, the tower is 129 metres tall. At the top is a large turning advertising sign, in place since 1997 (the advertisement was firstly for Philips, then for Siemens from 2006 to 2013, and is currently for Kia Motors). Including that advertising sign, the total height of the tower is 143 m.

The tower has been built at the former location of the Pleyel et Cie factories. Several projects have been proposed since 1959, the one which had been adopted was planning the building of 4 identical towers in the middle of a large urban park of 4 ha. Plans for heliports on the roofs of the towers were even made. Only one of the originally planned towers has been built.

The tower is located nearby the metro station of Carrefour Pleyel on Line 13.

Since July 22, 2024, the tower has housed a luxury hotel, operated by the German group H-Hotels. This was after the tower was marked at the end of the 2000s by obsolescence and unsuitability to the needs of businesses, so its restructuring was studied during the 2010s.

== History ==
=== Restructuring from 2016 to 2024 ===
The Financière des Quatre Rives (FQR) company gradually bought all the surface areas of the Tour Pleyel and its annexes from 2008, on behalf of the Pleyel Investissement company. Completely cleaned and asbestos-free, the tower was converted into a four-star hotel tower with nearly 700 rooms, a swimming pool and a panoramic bar at the top. The renovated tower is aiming for BREEAM environmental certification at the "Very Good" level.

Work on the Pleyel Tower was completed in the summer of 2024, before that year's Summer Olympics, with the commercial opening taking place on 22 July 2024. The renovated tower will be surrounded by a new seven-floor U-shaped office building including a 9,000m2 conference center to which a second tertiary tower, with 25 floors, the Maestro Tower, will be added.

== See also ==
- Skyscraper
- List of tallest structures in Paris
