= Tour CBX =

- Interactive map of the Tour CBX area

General information
- Type: Office
- Location: La Défense (Courbevoie)
- Coordinates: 48°53′28″N 2°14′48″E
- Construction started: 2002
- Completed: 2005

Height
- Antenna spire: 142 m (466 ft)
- Roof: 142 m (466 ft)

Technical details
- Floor count: 36
- Floor area: 40,000 m^{2} (430,000 sq ft)

Design and construction
- Architects: Kohn Pedersen Fox Associates, Saubot Rouit Metge

Tour CBX or Tour Dexia is an office skyscraper located in Supercomplex 2 of the La Défense business district situated west of Paris, France.

Built from 2002 to 2005, the tower is 142 metres tall. The tower is built nearby the La Défense circular boulevard on its northern side, and a pedestrian bridge connects it to the district's esplanade on the southern side. The CBX tower is also one of the few towers in La Défense having an inclined roof.

The CBX Tower has its name in the name of attributed codes to the buildings in the plan mass of the Defense. For example:

- PB12 (Puteaux - office building - 12th location), that is today the Tower Opus 12.
- CH13 (Courbevoie - dwelling building - 13th location), that is the residence Vision 80.

When the tower is looked at from the west, its shape recalls the shape of the Flatiron Building built in 1902 in New York City.

== See also ==
- Skyscraper
- La Défense
- List of tallest structures in Paris
