= Opus 12 Tower =

Coordinates: 48°53′23″N 2°14′33″E

Opus 12 Tower in 2024

The Tour Opus 12, or Tour Credit Lyonnais, is a major office block in la Défense, Paris. It was designed by architects Jean Dubuisson and Jean-Pierre Jausserand, and Valode et Pistre for restoration.
