= Tour La Villette =

Tour Daewoo
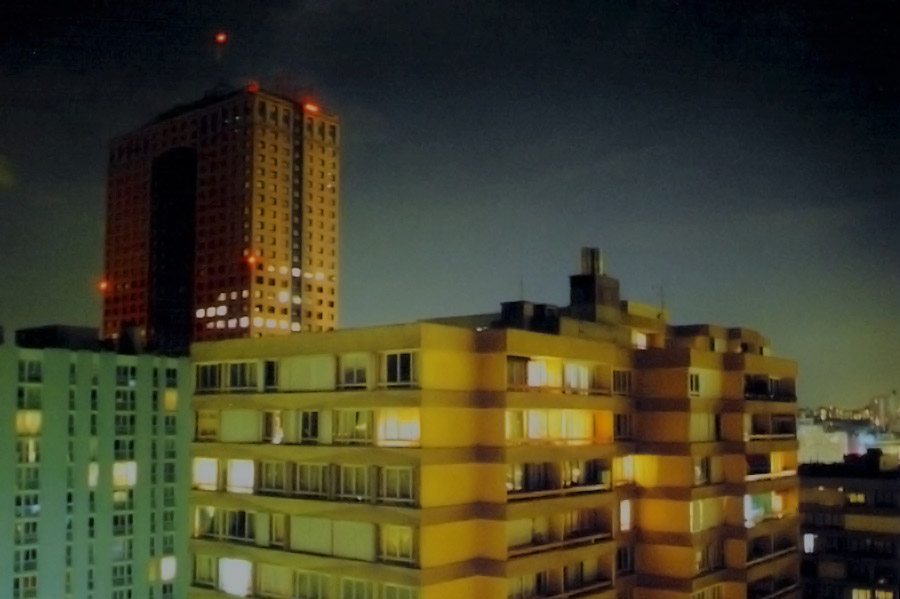
- Interactive map of the Tour Daewoo area

General information
- Type: Office
- Location: Aubervilliers (North of Paris)
- Coordinates: 48°54′6″N 2°23′16″E
- Completed: 1972

Height
- Antenna spire: 125 m (410 ft)
- Roof: 125 m (410 ft)

Technical details
- Floor count: 35
- Floor area: 45,000 m^{2} (480,000 sq ft)

The Tour La Villette (previously known as the Tour Daewoo, Tour Périphérique and Tour Olympe) is an office skyscraper located in Aubervilliers, in the inner suburbs of Paris, France.

Built in 1974, and renovated in the 1990s, it reaches a height of 125 metres (410 ft). It is located at the Porte de la Villette, near the Boulevard Périphérique separating Paris from its suburbs. It hosted the European headquarters of the Korean enterprise Daewoo.

== See also ==
- Skyscraper
- List of tallest structures in Paris
