= Tour CB21 =

Office skyscraper located in La Défense

- Tour CB21
- Interactive map of the Tour CB21 area

General information
- Type: Office
- Location: La Défense (Courbevoie)
- Coordinates: 48°53′20.00″N 2°14′59.30″E
- Construction started: 1972
- Completed: 1974

Height
- Antenna spire: 187 m (614 ft)
- Roof: 179 m (587 ft)

Technical details
- Floor count: 44
- Floor area: 70,500 m^{2} (759,000 sq ft)

Design and construction
- Architects: Harrison & Abramovitz, J. P. Bisseuil

Website
- www.cb21-ladefense.com?lang=en

Tour CB21, formerly Tour Gan, is an office skyscraper located in La Défense, the high-rise business district situated west of Paris, France. It was designed by celebrated American architect Max Abramovitz.

== History ==
Built from 1972 to 1974, the tower is 179 m (587 ft) tall at roof height. However, it reaches 187 m (614 ft) once including the antenna located on the roof. It was the second tallest building in Paris upon its completion. Its ground shape is in the form of a Greek cross.

In 1972, during construction, a protest campaign opposed the building of Tour Gan. Protesters demanded a reduction in height. However, the tower was completed at the planned height.

Today, the main tenants are Suez Environnement and AIG France.

The structure is owned by Fonciere des Regions.

== See also ==
- Skyscraper
- La Défense
- List of tallest structures in Paris
