= Tour Total =

Office skyscraper in Paris, France

- Tour Total, La Défense, Paris
- Interactive map of the Tour Total area

General information
- Type: Office
- Architectural style: Modern architecture
- Location: La Défense (Courbevoie)
- Coordinates: 48°53′34″N 2°14′35″E
- Construction started: 1982
- Completed: 1985

Height
- Antenna spire: 190 m (620 ft)
- Roof: 187 m (614 ft)

Technical details
- Floor count: 48
- Floor area: 130,000 m^{2} (1,400,000 sq ft)

Design and construction
- Architects: WZMH Architects, Roger Saubot

Website
- totalenergies.com/fr/groupe

Tour Total (previously known as Tour Elf from 1985 to 1999, then Tour TotalFinaElf from 1999 to 2003) is an office skyscraper located in La Défense, Courbevoie, the high-rise business district west of and adjacent to the city of Paris, France, designed in the Modern architectural style. The building now serves as headquarters for TotalEnergies, one of the six "Supermajor" oil companies in the world.

Completed and opened in 1985, it is the third-tallest skyscraper in La Défense and the fourth-tallest skyscraper in the Paris area, after the Tour First and the Tour Montparnasse. Tour Total is 190 m (623 ft) tall; a three-metre (9 ft) long antenna is located on its roof, which is 187 m (614 ft) above the ground.

The site on which the Tour Total was built was initially reserved for a skyscraper which would have been a twin tower to Tour Areva, but the oil shock of 1974 forced the investors to cancel their project.

Tour Total is one of La Défense's third generation of skyscrapers. Architects took into account the flaws in towers of previous generations (such as Tour Areva, Tour Gan and Tour AXA). For instance, the Tour Total is much more efficient in terms of energy consumption than previous La Défense skyscrapers.

Standing 48 storeys tall, Tour Total actually consists of five bodies of different heights super-imposed on each other. The tallest of those bodies has 48 floors, while the next two have 44 and 37 floors respectively.

== See also ==
- Skyscraper
- La Défense
- List of tallest structures in Paris
