= List of works by Louis-Ernest Barrias =

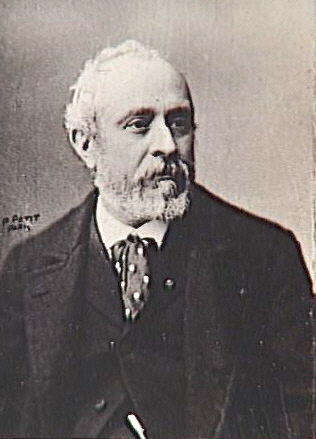
Barrias

Louis-Ernest Barrias was born in Paris into a family of artists. His father was a porcelain-painter, and his brother Félix-Joseph Barrias (1822–1907) was a painter and illustrator. He started as a trainee painter working in the studio of Léon Cogniet but soon turned to sculpture and started to study under Pierre-Jules Cavelier. He entered the studio of François Jouffroy in 1858 as a student at the l'École des Beaux-arts and in 1861 he won second place in that year's Prix de Rome with the composition "Chryséis rendu à son père par Ulysse". In the same year he made his debut at the Paris Salon with his bust of the engraver Jazet. In 1865 he carried off first prize in the Prix de Rome with the work "Fondation de la ville de Marseille" which enabled him to study in Rome. He returned to France when the Franco-Prussian war broke out and enrolled in the Marne National Guard. He was to see active service in the siege of Paris. After the war and until his death, Barrias was in great demand. He received many honours, was made a member of the Institute, and was professor at the l'École des Beaux-arts from 1894 until his death. This listing covers some of his more important works.

== Key ==
Meaning
Works
Works dismantled and the bronze melted down for armament manufacture
Funereal works

== Works ==
Name	Location	Photograph	Date	Notes
Chryséis rendue à son père par Ulysse or Ulysse rendant Chrysès â Ghryséis	Whereabouts unknown	—	1861	This composition was awarded second prize in the Prix de Rome competition of that year.
Bust of his father Félix-Joseph Barrias.	The bust is in the possession of the Barrias family.	—	1861	This bust was exhibited at the 1861 Paris Salon.
Bust of the engraver Alexandre Jazet	Held by the Jazet family.	—	1861	This bust dates to 1861.
Terracotta frieze	Deauville	—	1863	Carried out for the villa Jolivet.
Bust of Jules Favre	Lyon	—	1863	This marble bust is held in Lyon's prefecture. It was shown at the Paris Salon of 1863.
Bust of Pierre-Jules Cavelier	In possession of the Barrias family.	—	1863	Pierre-Jules Cavelier was Barrias' teacher at the École Nationals Supérieure des Beaux-Arts. This bust was shown at the Paris Salon of 1863.
Allégories maritimes	Present whereabouts not known	—	1864	This decoration was for the outside of a villa in Deauville.
Fondation de la ville de Marseille	École nationale supérieure des Beaux-Arts	—	1865	This was the plaster bas-relief with which Barrias won the 1865 Prix de Rome. Barrias depicts Glyptis, the daughter of a Gallic chief, being chosen as the wife of Photis.
Jeune fille de Mégare	Paris	—	1870	This composition in marble dates to 1870 although the plaster version was completed in Rome in 1867 and sent back to Paris. When the work had been finished in Rome it was given the title "La Fileuse, souvenir de Mégare" A silvered bronze version was exhibited in Vienna in 1873. Reworked as "Jeune fille de Bou Saada" for Bou Saada's tomb. Versions issued in wax and shown at the Paris Salon of 1890 and in that year a bronze version made for the Montmartre cemetery. See section on funerary works.
Jeune Romain	Whereabouts unknown	—	1867	This work was completed whilst Barrias was studying in Rome.
Statue of Virgil	Hôtel Païva. Paris	—	—	Three statues can be seen in Paris' Hôtel Païva in the avenue des Champs-Elysées. These are of Dante, Virgil and Petrache and that of Virgil is by Barrias. Barrias also produced a statuette called "Le Printemps" for the hotel.
Masks for decoration of Paris Opera House.	Opéra de Paris	—	1871	The commission to sculpt some decorative masks for the Paris Opera came in 1871.
Bust of Henri Regnault	Musée d'Orsay, Paris	—	1871	Bronze bust dates to 1871. The plaster version is held in Copenhagen by Ny Carlsberg Glyptotek and there are other bronze versions in the Musée Carnavalet, the Petit Palais in Paris, in Saint-Cloud and in the Musée Hébert.
Maçonnerie et Serrurerie	Opéra de Paris		1872	Following on from his sculpting of the masks mentioned above, Barrias was commissioned in 1872, to carry out further work for the Opéra de Paris with this sculpture above the door leading to the foyer The Musée d'Orsay hold the original plaster maquette of the work.
Le serment de Spartacus (The oath of Spartacus)	Jardin des Tuilerie (Tuileries Garden)	—	1872	This composition was shown at the Paris Salon in 1872 and the 1878 Exposition universelle. This was the final piece which Barrias sent back to Paris from Rome. There is a version in marble at Glyptothèque Jacobsen Ny-Carlsberg in Copenhagen and the plaster model is held in Rome at the l'Académie de France, Villa Médicis.
Statue of Bossuet	Sorbonne	Statue of Bossuet on the facade of the Chapelle_de_la_Sorbonne	1873	A statue of Bossuet, the Bishop of Meaux, for the Sorbonne's church
Marble group.	Rio de Janeiro	—	—	Sculpture of an angel carrying a newly born baby was commissioned for the tomb of a child of the Countess of Eu.
Bust of Georges Clairin	Musée d'Orsay.	—	1875	A terracotta bust of the painter Georges Clairin. Barrias inscribed "À mon ami Clairin / E.Barrias 1875"' on the right shoulder.
Hôtel de ville de Poitiers	Poitiers	—	1875	Allegories of "Agriculture" and "Science" sculpted for the Poitiers town hall
"L'Architecture" and "La Comptabilité"	Pavillon de Marsan (Palais du Louvre)	—	1878-9	These two allegories date to between 1878 and 1879.
Les Premières Funérailles	Petit Palais	Les Premières Funérailles	1878	A marble composition depicting Adam and Eve carrying the body of Abel won the "médaille d'honneur" at the Paris Salon of 1878.
Bust of Jules Armand Dufaure	La Rochelle	—	1880	The bust is located in what was the hôtel Lanusse and is now the La Rochelle prefecture at 38 rue Réaumur.
Statue of Blaise Pascal	Sorbonne	—	1887	Can be seen in the Sorbonne's amphitheatre.
"Les Fleurs" and "Les Fruits"	Paris	—	1883	These two bas-reliefs were created for a building in Paris' avenue de Messine.
La Défense de Paris	Puteaux		1883	This statue honours the French soldiers who defended Paris from the attack by the Prussians in 1870. The inauguration took place in 1883. In 1983 the statue was dismantled and restored before being placed in the quarter of Paris called la Défense after Barrias' iconic work.
The Alligator Hunters/Les Nubiens or Les chasseurs d'Alligators	Musée d'Orsay. Paris		1894	This high relief in the Musée d'Orsay's collection was designed for the façade of the Galerie de paléontologie et d'anatomie comparée (Gallery of Palaeontology and Comparative Anatomy) which is a part of the French Muséum national d'histoire naturelle (National Museum of Natural History). It is situated in the Jardin des Plantes in Paris near the Gare d'Austerlitz. It was cast in bronze by Thiébaut in 1897 and it is the bronze version in the Jardin des Plantes.
Victor Schœlcher monument	Cayenne	Statue of Victor Schœlcher	1897	Monument to Victor Schœlcher
Medallion Julien Guadet	Grand Palais (Musée d'Orsay)	—	—	Dedicated to the architect Gaudet.
Monument Talabot	St-Geniez-d'Olt		—	Monument dedicated to Paulin Talabot
Bust of Olympe Hériot	Château de la Boissière-École	—	—	Bust in white marble.
Bust of André-Joseph Allar	Beaux-arts de Paris École nationale supérieure	—	—	Bust of fellow sculptor Allar.
Monument de la défense de Saint-Quentin	Saint-Quentin		1881	This monument honours the citizens of Saint-Quentin who repulsed the attack on Saint- Quentin by German troops on 8 October 1870 and the soldiers of the "l'armée du nord" who defeated a much larger German force in the battle of 19 January 1871. Barrias' 1881 maquette is held by the Musée Antoine Lécuyer.
Bust of Auguste Hériot	Château de la Boissière-Ecole	—	1886	Sculpture was cast in bronze by Thiébaut frères. Thought to date to 1886.
Statue of Pascal	Sorbonne	—	1886	This statue can be seen in a niche at the top of one of the pillars supporting the Sorbonne's amphitheatre.
Bust of Amédée Dechambre	Paris	—	1886	This bust can be seen in the Académie de Médecine in Paris' rue Bonaparte.
Statue of Joan of Arc	Bonsecours		1890-2	The monument was designed by Juste Lisch. It consists of the chapel of "Notre-Dame des Soldats" which holds the sculpture of Joan.
Marble bust entitled "Paysan de la campagne de Rome; Tête d'étude"	Montpellier	—	1874	Dated to 1874 and held in Montpellier's Musée des Beaux-arts.
Decorative group entitled "L'Électricité"	See comment below	—	1889	Composition created for the "Galerie des Machines" at the Éxposition Universelle. The work no longer exists but the plaster cast can be seen in Copenhagen's Glyptothèque Jacobsen.
Monument Emile Augier	Paris	—	1895	This monument stands in Paris' place de l'Odéon.
La Nature	Bordeaux	—	1874	The composition can be seen outside Bordeaux' Faculty of Medicine and Pharmacy.
La fée aux lézards		—	1889	This Jardinière exhibited at the 1889 l'Exposition Universelle. It was purchased by the founders Barbedienne and cast in bronze.
La Nature se dévoilant	Musée d'Orsay	La Nature se dévoilant a la Science	1899	This statuette was cast in bronze by Susse Frères. Originally worked from marble and Algerian onyx and ordered for the main staircase of the Conservatoire des Arts et Métiers but held by the Musée d'Orsay. Copies in terracotta held in the Petit Palais, Paris et Musée Chéret, Nice and a white marble version is held by Bordeaux' Faculté de Médecine. Suse Frères have issued limited editions in bronze, ivory, marble and precious stones. The Musée d'Aquitaine in Bordeaux have a plaster version and another marble version is in Copenhagen's Ny Carlsberg Glyptotek.
Statue of Bernard Palissy	Boulogne-Billancourt	—	1883	Bronze dates to 1883 and was cast by Thiébaut frères.
Bust of Louis La Caze		—	1901	Thought to have been executed in about 1901, this marble bust was commissioned by the Musée du Louvre for display in their Lacaze rooms. It was based on a self- portrait by the artist himself.
Bust of Claire Eiffel.		—	1883	Plaster bust. A version was made in marble and this is kept in the possession of the Eiffel family.
Mozart as a child		—	1883	A plaster version was shown at the Exposition Nationale des Beaux-Arts in 1883, a marble version was shown at the Paris Salon of 1891 and this can be seen at Ny Carlsberg Glyptotek in Copenhagen. Bronze version cast by Barbedienne and the Manufacture de Sèvres issued a version in biscuit.
Monument aux soldats morts pendant la conquête, ou Monument du protectorat français (Monument to those soldiers killed in the conquest or the Monument to the French protectorate).	Tananarive	—	1902	This reminder of France's colonial history stands in Tananarive, Madagascar.
L'Étude	Bibliothèque Nationale de France Richelieu in Paris	—	1903	This allegory of studying can be seen on the façade of the Bibliothèque Nationale de France Richelieu at the corner of the Rue Vivienne and Rue Colbert. In this high-relief a young woman is depicted leaning on her desk whilst reading a book.
Le Chant dit aussi la Poésie	Rennes	—	—	This bronze, cast by Thiébaut Frères, is held by Rennes' Musée des Beaux-Arts.
La Musique	Rennes	—	1883	Bronze held by Rennes' musée des Beaux-Arts.
La Reconnaissance	Mulhouse		1900	Sculpture executed in 1900 and changed slightly in 1926 for the centenary celebrations of the "Société industrielle de Mulhouse"
David terrassant Goliath	Gap	—	—	The Gap museum hold this plaster composition.
Château de Valmirande		—	—	A statue of Christ can be seen in the chateau's chapel.

== Works dismantled and the bronze melted down for armament manufacture ==
Many of Barrias' bronze sculptures were melted down either directly by the Germans or by order of the Vichy regime during 1941 and 1942. These are listed below.

Name	Location	Photograph	Date	Notes
Statue Philippe Ricord				A bronze
Monument to Sadi Carnot			1895	In the composition an allegory of history was handing Carnot a golden palm whilst holding a tablet on which part of a speech which Carnot had given in Bordeaux on 28 April 1888 was written. A child held a bouquet of everlasting flowers and a shield bearing the arms of Bordeaux.
Monument to Victor Hugo.				This monument stood in the Place Victor-Hugo (Paris). It had been inaugurated in 1902 to celebrate the centenary of Hugo's birth. In 1964 the Fountain de la place Victor Hugo was erected where the Hugo monument had stood. The bas-reliefs survived the German dismantling and can be seen, together with a Denys Puech medallion of Hugo's friend Meurice in Veules-les-roses
Statue of Maria Deraismes			1898	In 1983 a copy was made and erected where Barrias' work had stood.
Statue of Lavoisier		Lavoisier statue		Original statue had been erected in Paris in 1900. Fortunately the Musée Grenoble hold the original plaster model. The Grenoble museum also hold a plaster relief by Barrias showing him at work in his laboratory in 1900. This, cast in bronze, had also been part of the dismantled monument.

== Funereal works ==
Barrias executed several sculptures for the decoration of graves.

Name	Location	Photograph	Date	Notes
The tomb of Charles Bigot	Cimetière du Père-Lachaise			Bronze dated 1894 placed on Bigot's tomb
The tomb of Lucien Magne	Saint-Geniez (Aveyron) cemetery			Barrias executed a sculpture for Magne's tomb
The tomb of Joseph Garnier	Cimetière de Montmartre			Barrias' bronze portrait fixed to Garnier' tomb.
Bronze medallion of the painter Gustave Guillaumet	musée d'Orsay		1890	Dated to around 1890 this large medallion was affixed to the tomb of Guillaumet. The tomb was also decorated with the sculpture "Jeune fille de Bou Saada", a wax version of which had been presented at the Paris Salon of 1890. There are two versions of this work in plaster, one in Marseille and the other in Dijon's Musée des Beaux-Arts. The Musée d'Orsay copy is in bronze and was cast by Susse Frères. The Henry Walters museum in Baltimore have this version cast by It replicates the marble figurine on Guillaumet's tomb. Guillaumet spent much of his career in Bou-Saada, Algeria.
The tomb of Emma-Adèle Blanche	Cimetière du Père-Lachaise		1884	A marble medallion.
Tomb of the Barboux family.	Cimetière du Montparnasse		1894	Sculpture of a woman reading to a child entitled " l'Éducation maternelle"
Effigy of the Duchess of Alençon	Musée de Dreux		1904	This effigy was originally placed on the tomb of the Duchess of Alençon in the Dreux "Chapelle Royale". It was subsequently replaced and can now be seen in the Dreux museum.
The tomb of Alexis-Joseph Mazerolle	Cimetière du Montparnasse			Bronze medallion on Mazerolle's tomb
The tomb of Madame Dreyfus	Lima		1874	In 1874, Barrias was commissioned to create some sculpture for Madame Dreyfus' tomb in Lima. The composition included the figure of the deceased in marble with four statues in bronze;an allegory of religion holding a cross, an allegory of charity shown with two children, the figure of St Sophie and an angel holding a crown.
The tomb of Antoine-Gaëtan Guérinot	Cimetière du Père-Lachaise			The composition "L'architecture" was placed on architect Guérinot's tomb
The tomb of Thomas Couture	Cimetière du Père-Lachaise		1885	Barrias created sculptures of two cherubs for the painter Thomas Couture's tomb, these positioned on either side of the bronze bust of Couture by Tony Noël. The two cherub sculptures were stolen.
The tomb of Anatole de la Forge	Cimetière du Père-Lachaise			A statue of de la Forge decorates his tomb.

== Note ==
Article on Barrias and the use of allegory

== See also ==
- Pierre-Marie Poisson

== Gallery ==
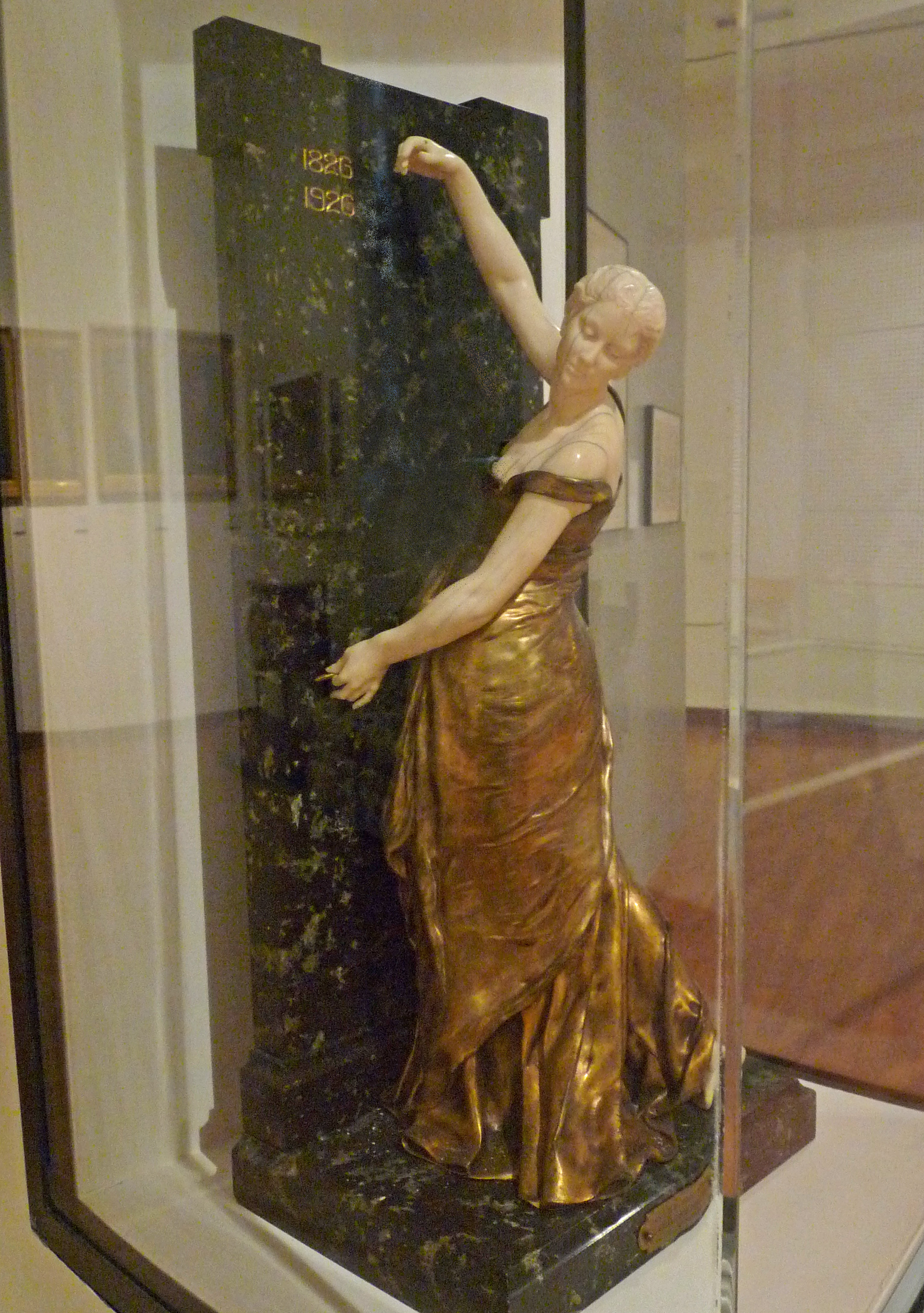
La Reconnaissance

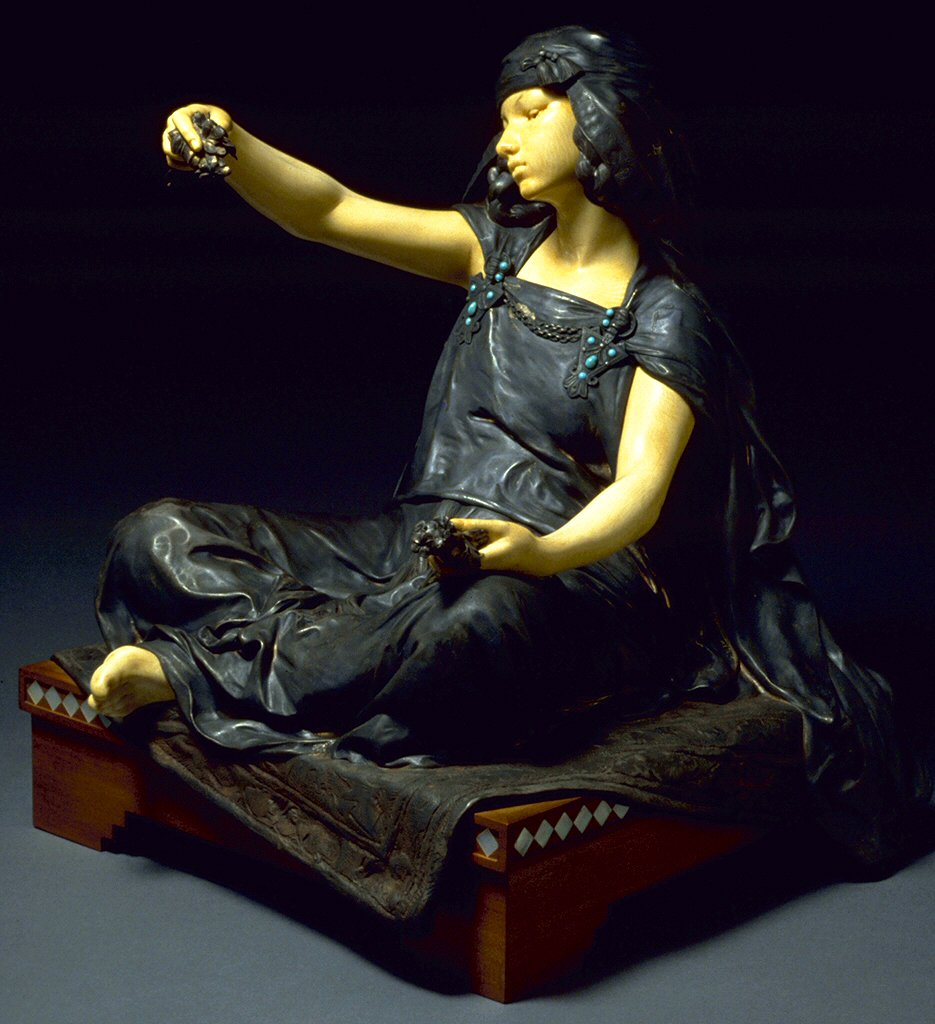
Version of Barrias work in Baltimore

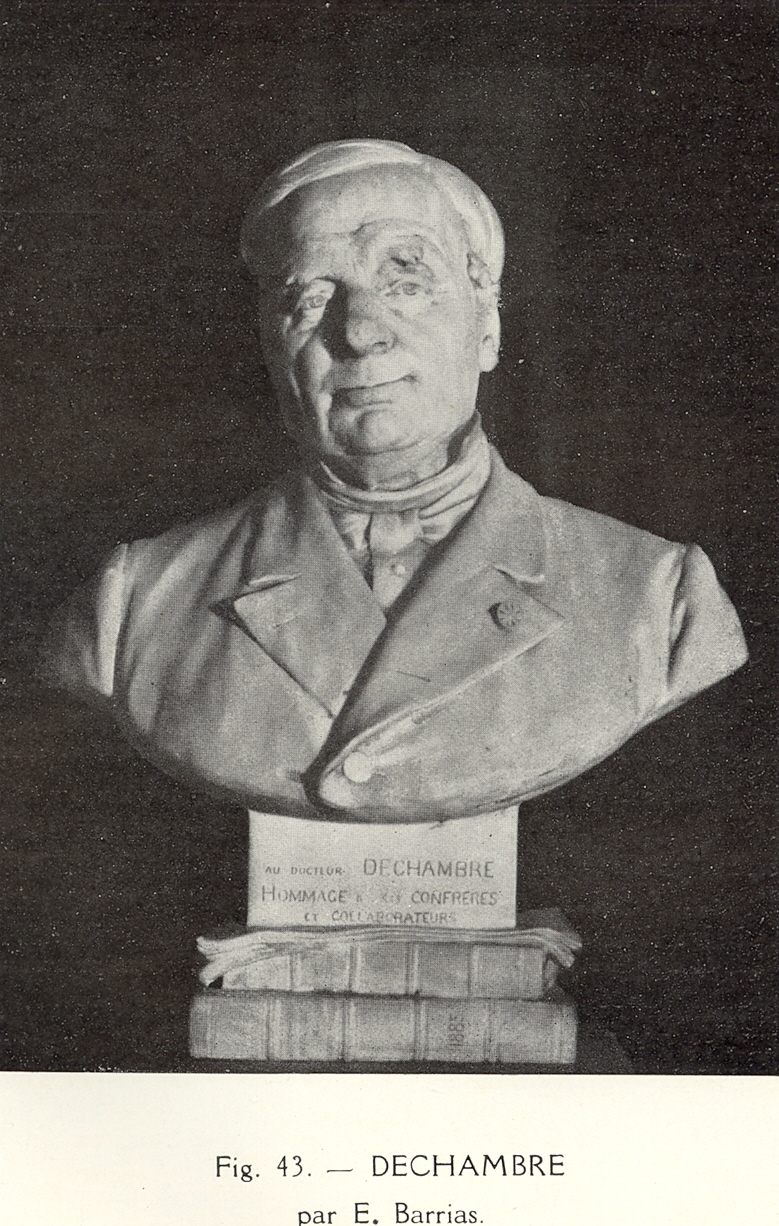
Bust of Dechambre.

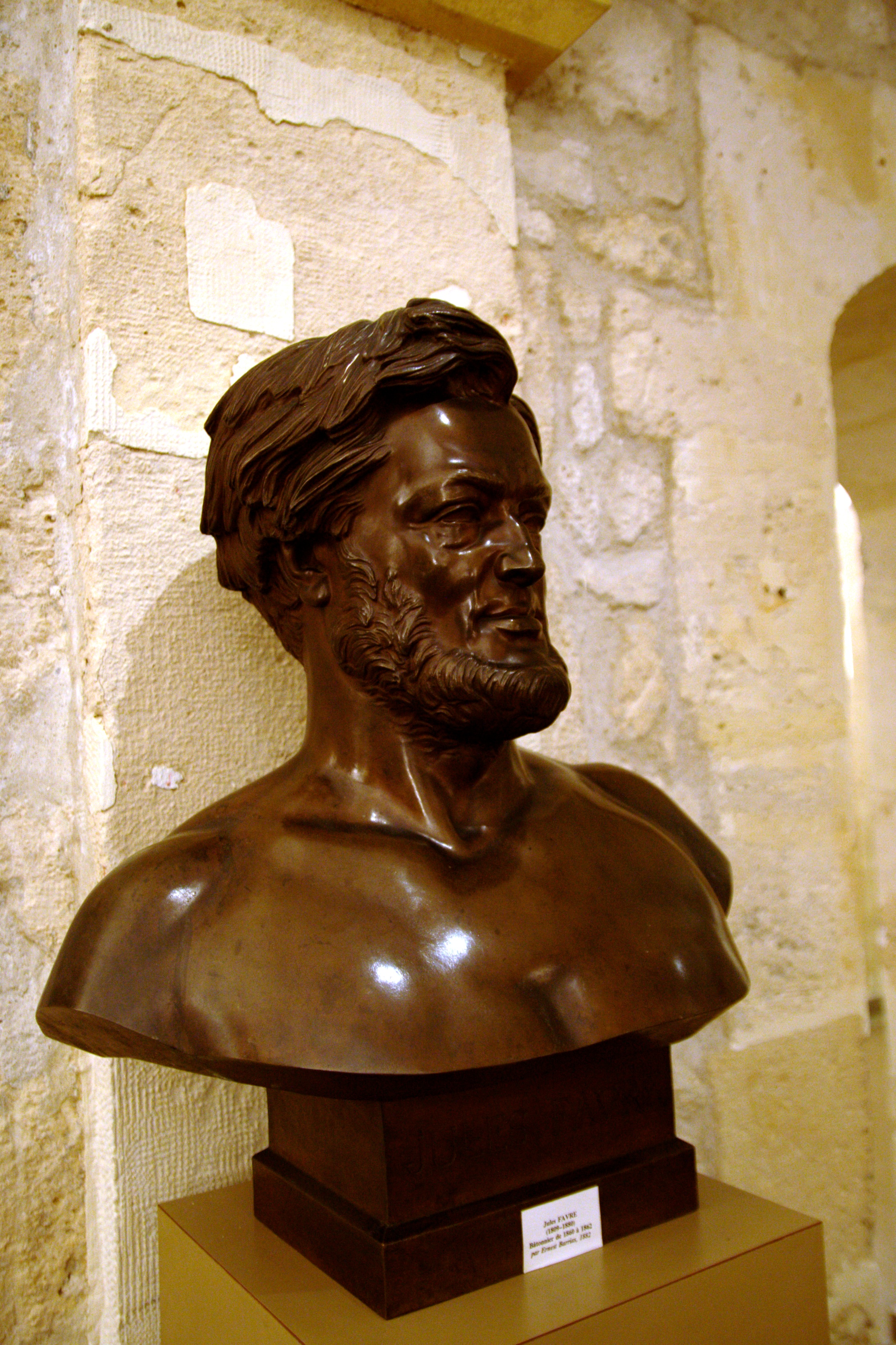
Bust of Jules Favre,

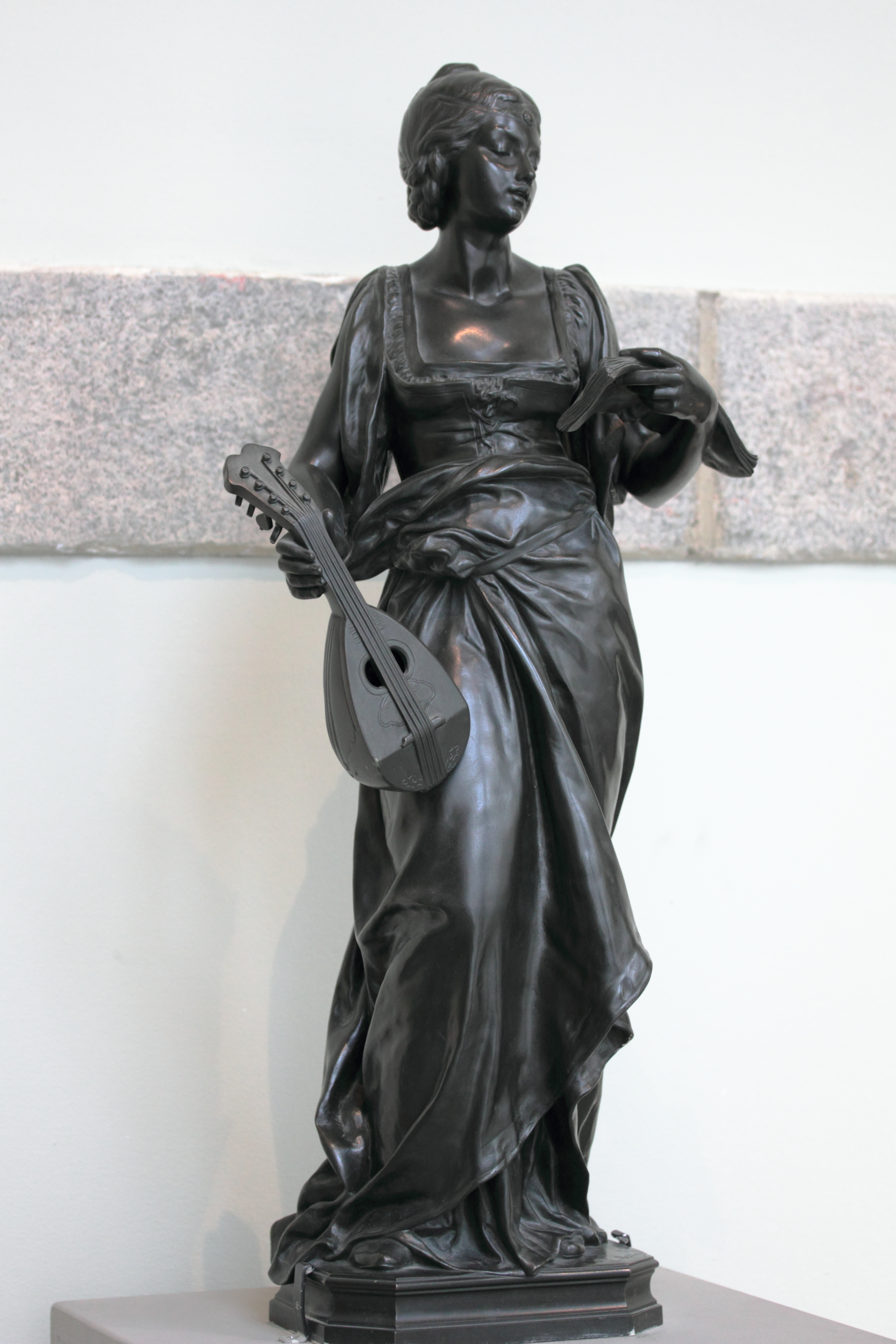
Le Chant

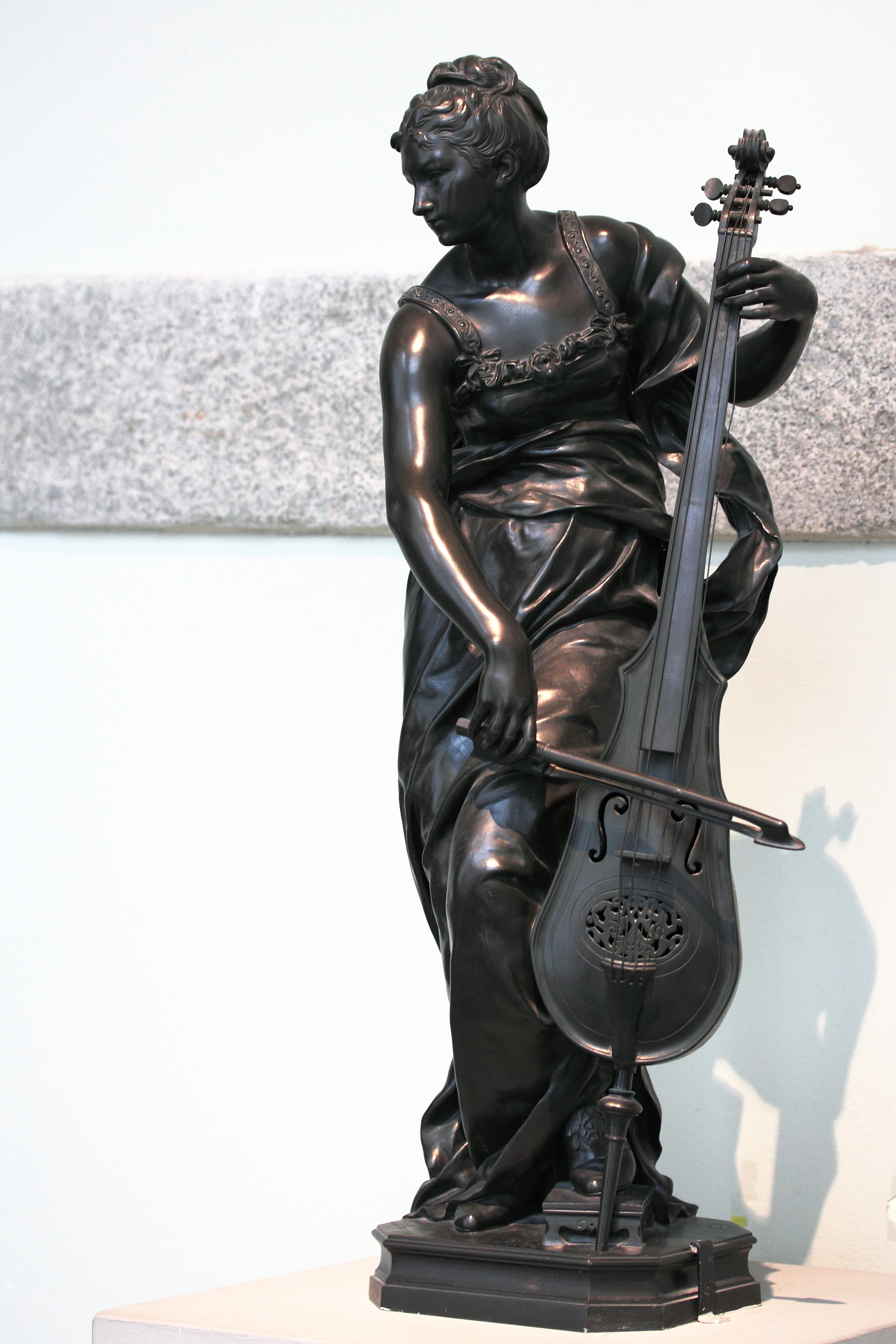
La Musique

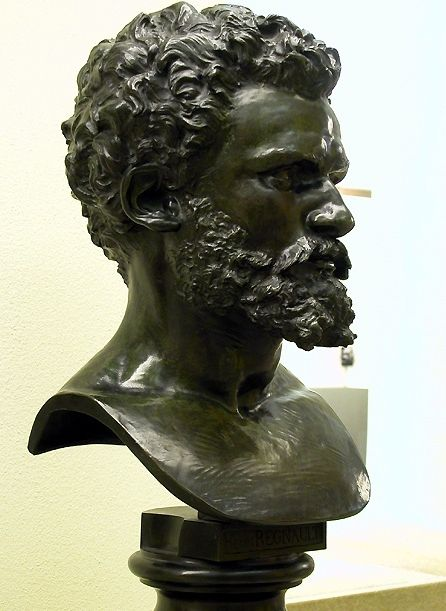
Bust of Henri Regnault.

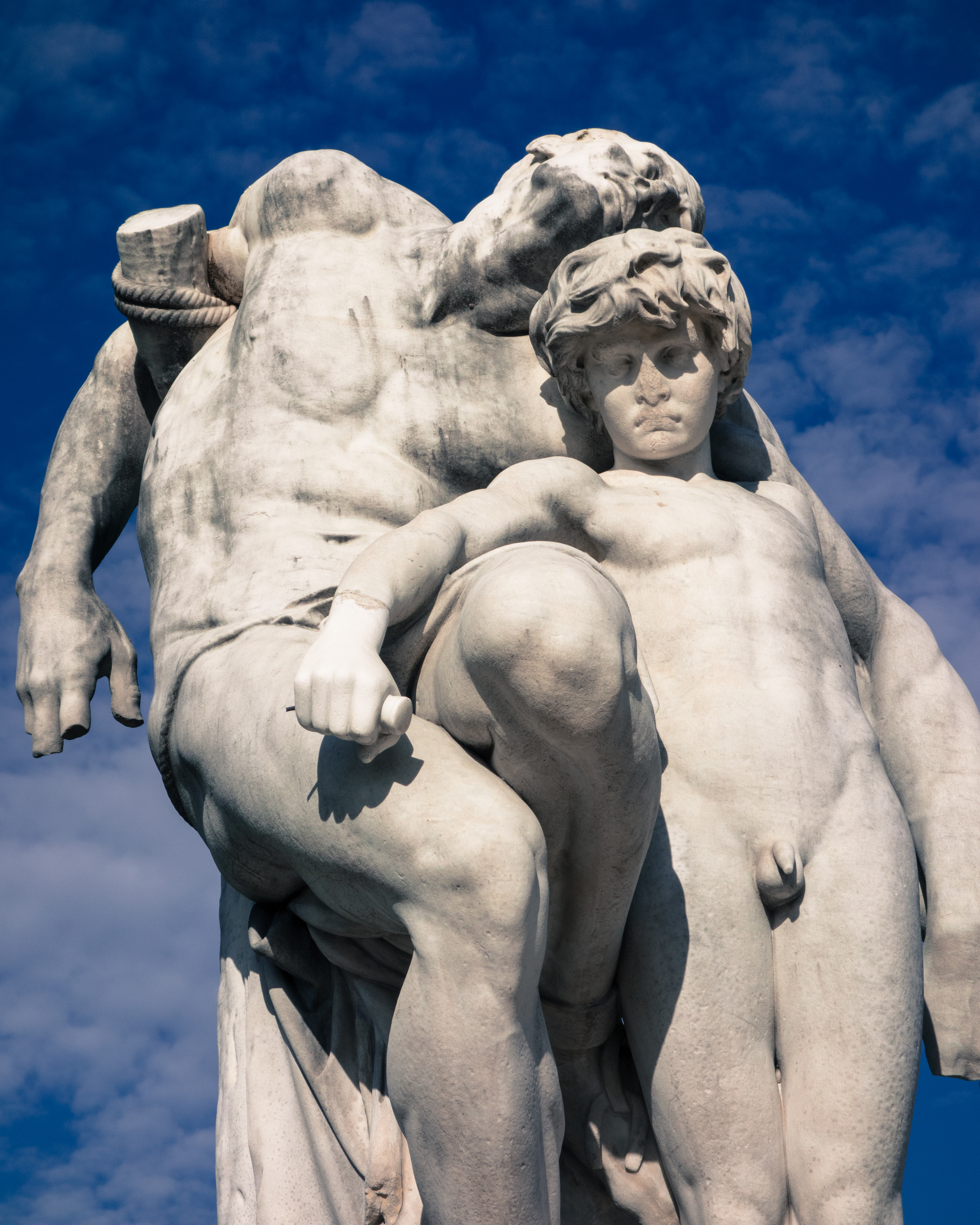
Le serment de Spartacus.

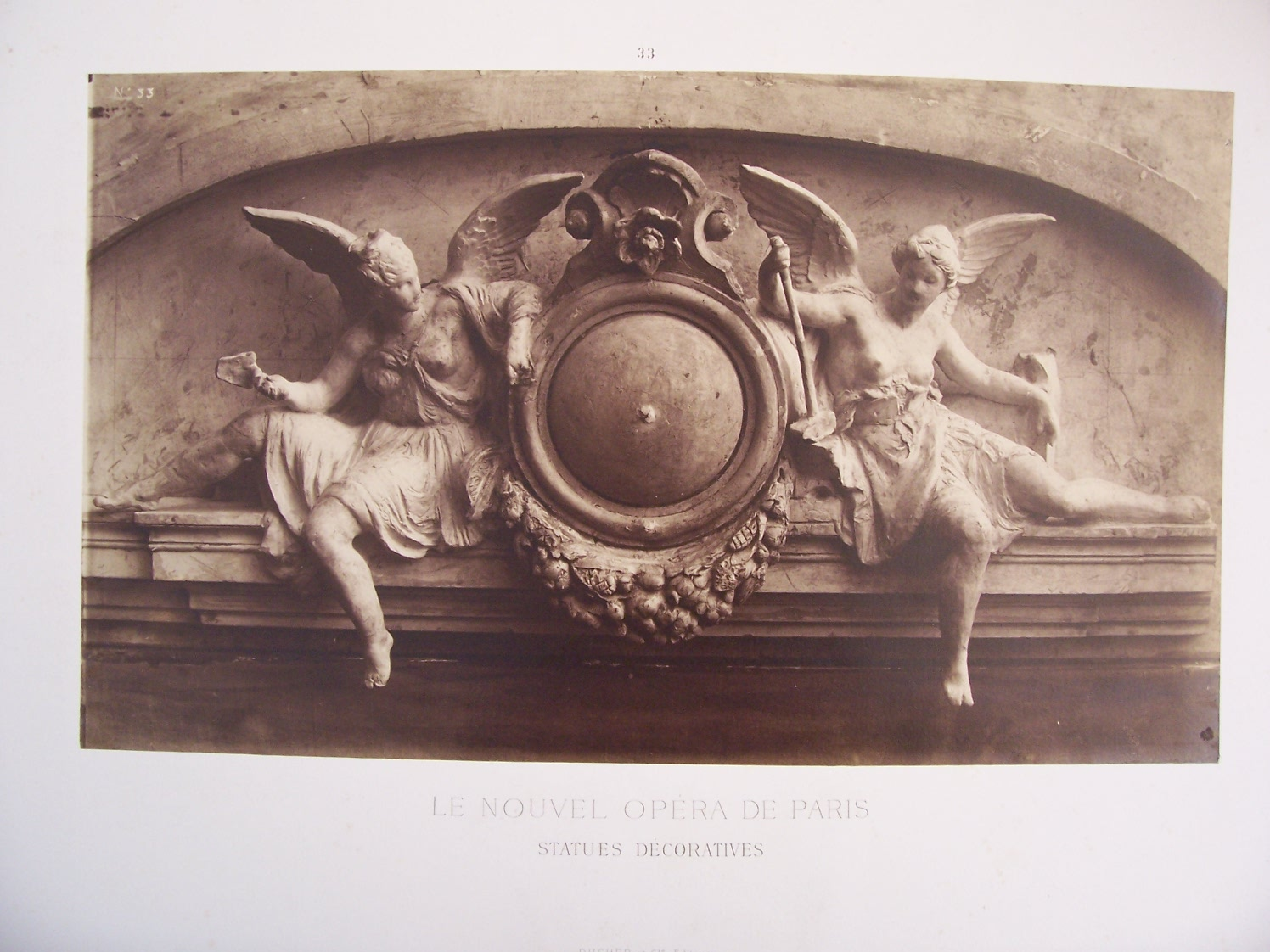
Maconnerie et Serrurerie.

== Recommended reading ==
- Freeman, Kirrily (2009). Bronzes to Bullets: Vichy and the Destruction of French Public Statuary. Stanford University Press. ISBN 978-0-8047-7971-5.
