= The First Funeral =

Sculpture by Louis-Ernest Barrias

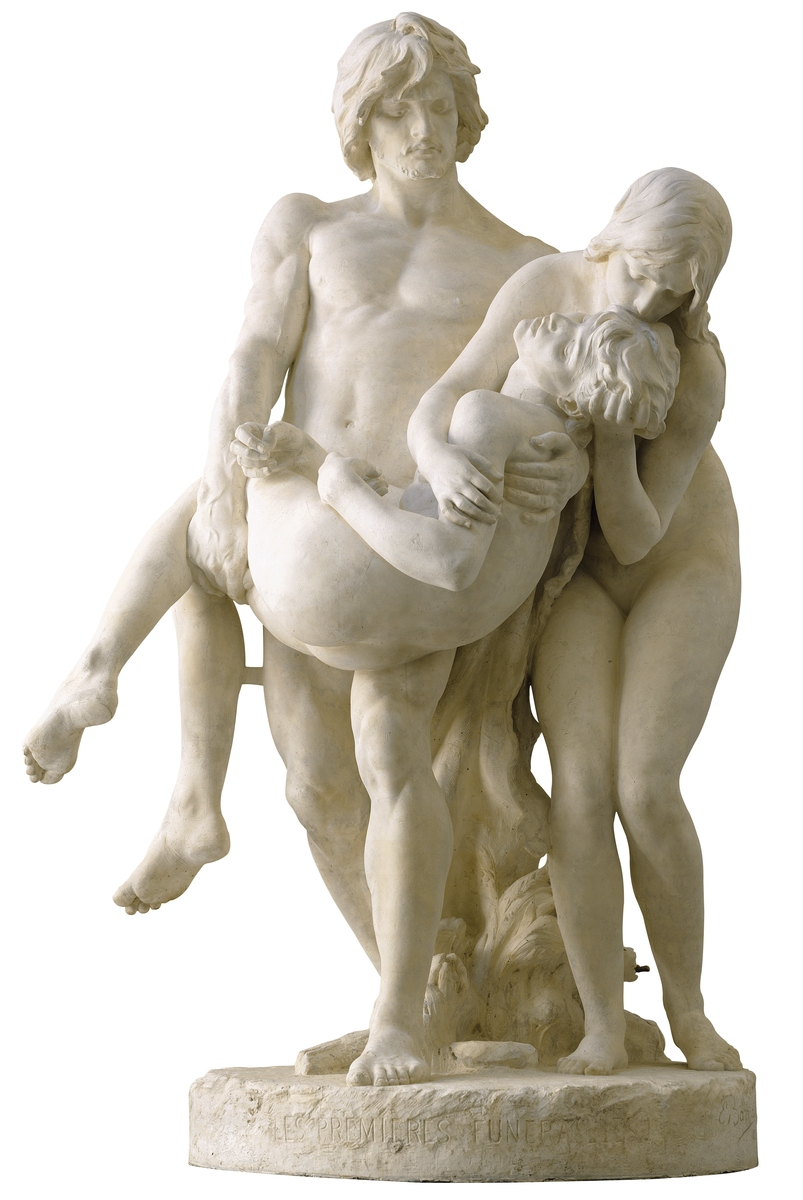
The First Funeral (1878) by Louis-Ernest Barrias

The First Funeral is an 1878 plaster sculpture by Louis-Ernest Barrias, first exhibited at the Paris Salon that year, where it won a medal of honour. He then produced a marble version for the Salon of 1883 which is now at the Petit Palais in Paris. The works show Adam and Eve bearing the body of their murdered son Abel. The plaster original is at the Museum of Fine Arts of Lyon. There is another marble copy at the Ny Carlsberg Glyptotek, in Copenhagen. There is also another marble version at the Museo Nacional de Bellas Artes (MNBA) of Argentina. The sizes of this version are: 159 x 99 x 74cm.

== Sources ==
- http://www.petitpalais.paris.fr/oeuvre/les-premieres-funerailles
