= High Line =

Linear park in New York City

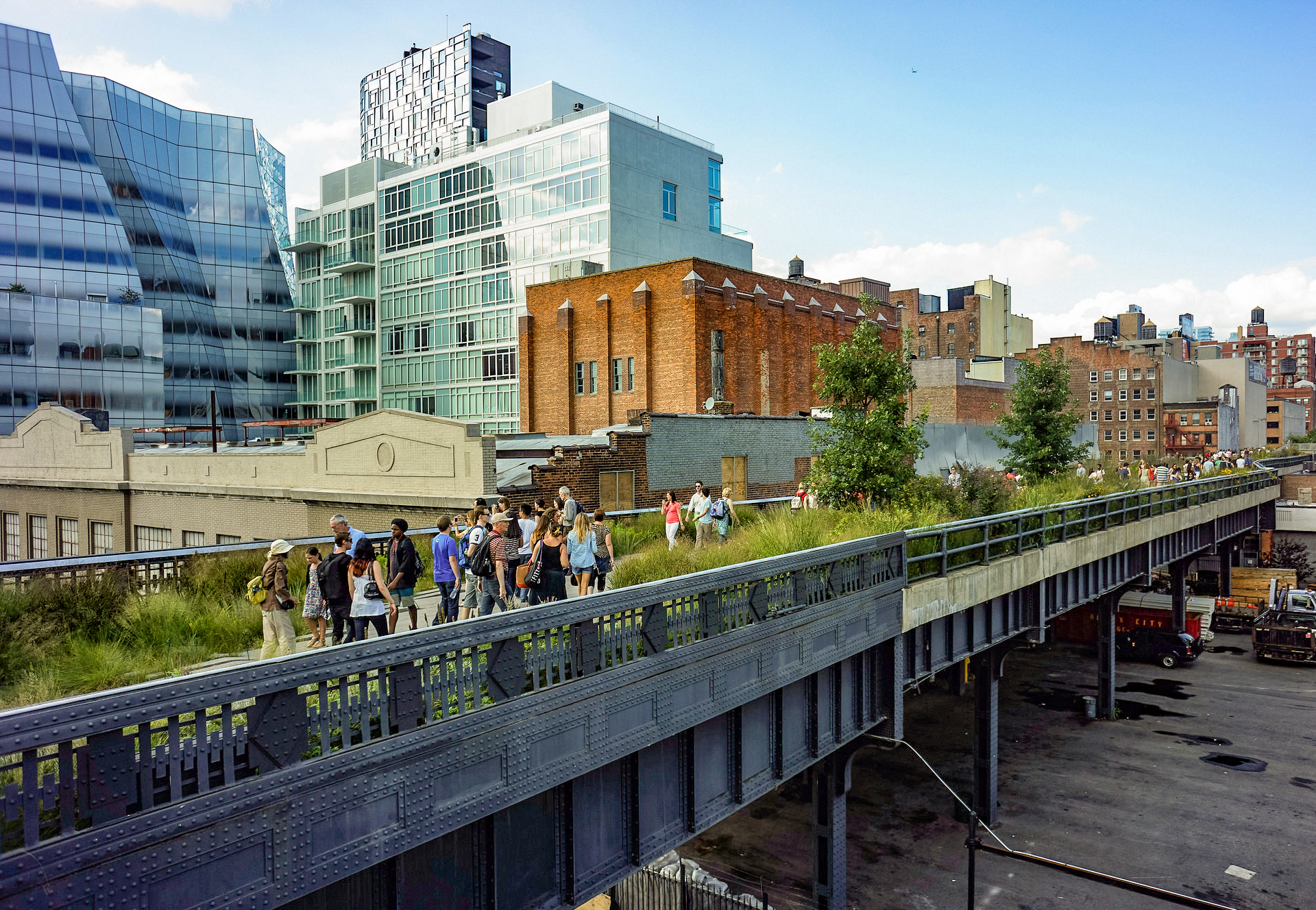
- The High Line by 18th Street
- Interactive route mapInteractive route map High Line route and entrances Hover over each pin for information
- Type: Elevated urban linear park; public park
- Location: Manhattan, New York City, U.S.
- Coordinates: 40°44′53″N 74°00′17″W
- Area: A linear 1.45-mile (2.33 km) stretch of viaduct
- Created: 2009; 17 years ago
- Operator: New York City Department of Parks and Recreation
- Visitors: 8 million (2019)
- Status: Operating
- Public transit: New York City Subway: 34th St–Hudson Yards ( trains) at park's north end 14th Street–Eighth Avenue ( trains) near park's south end New York City Bus: M11, M12, M14A, M14D, M23 SBS, M34 SBS at various places
- Website: thehighline.org

The High Line is a 1.45-mile-long (2.33 km) elevated linear park, greenway, and rail trail created on a former New York Central Railroad spur on the West Side of Manhattan in New York City. The High Line's design is a collaboration between James Corner Field Operations, Diller Scofidio + Renfro, and Piet Oudolf. The abandoned spur has been redesigned as a "living system" drawing from multiple disciplines which include landscape architecture, urban design, and ecology. The High Line was inspired by the 2.9-mile-long (4.7 km) Coulée verte (tree-lined walkway), another elevated park in Paris completed in 1993.

The park is built on an abandoned, southern viaduct section of the New York Central Railroad's West Side Line. Originating in the Meatpacking District, the park runs from Gansevoort Street—three blocks below 14th Street—through Chelsea to the northern edge of the West Side Yard on 34th Street near the Javits Center. The West Side Line formerly extended south to a railroad terminal at Spring Street, just north of Canal Street, and north to 35th Street at the site of the Javits Center. Due to a decline in rail traffic along the rest of the viaduct, it was effectively abandoned in 1980 when the construction of the Javits Center required the demolition of the viaduct's northernmost portion. The southern portion of the viaduct was demolished in segments during the late 20th century.

A nonprofit organization called Friends of the High Line was formed in 1999 by Joshua David and Robert Hammond, advocating its preservation and reuse as public open space, an elevated park or greenway. Celebrity New Yorkers joined in on fundraising and support for the concept. The administration of Mayor Michael Bloomberg announced plans for a High Line park in 2003. Repurposing the railway into an urban park began in 2006 and opened in phases during 2009, 2011, and 2014. The Spur, an extension of the High Line that originally connected with the Morgan General Mail Facility at Tenth Avenue and 30th Street, opened in 2019. The Moynihan Connector, extending east from the Spur to Moynihan Train Hall, opened in 2023.

Since opening in June 2009, the High Line has become an icon of American contemporary landscape architecture. The High Line's success has inspired cities throughout the United States to redevelop obsolete infrastructure as public space. The park became a tourist attraction and spurred real estate development in adjacent neighborhoods, increasing real-estate values and prices along the route. By September 2014, the park had nearly five million visitors annually, and by 2019, it had eight million visitors per year.

== Description ==
The High Line extends for 1.45 miles (2.33 km) from Gansevoort Street to 34th Street. At 30th Street the elevated tracks turn west around the Hudson Yards Redevelopment Project to the Jacob K. Javits Convention Center on 34th Street. As proposed, the park was to be integrated with the Hudson Yards development and the Hudson Park and Boulevard. If Hudson Yards' Western Rail Yard is built, it will be elevated above the High Line Park, so an exit along the viaduct over the West Side Yard will lead to the Western Rail Yard. The 34th Street entrance is at grade, with wheelchair access.

The park is open daily from 7:00 a.m. to 10:00 p.m. through the warmer months, and until 8:00 p.m. in winter. It can be reached through eleven entrances, five of which are accessible to people with disabilities. The wheelchair-accessible entrances, each with stairs and an elevator, are at Gansevoort, 14th, 16th, 23rd, and 30th Streets. Additional staircase-only entrances are located at 18th, 20th, 26th, and 28th Streets, and 11th Avenue. Street-level access is available at 34th Street via the Interim Walkway, which runs from 30th Street and 11th Avenue to 34th Street west of 11th Avenue.

=== Route ===
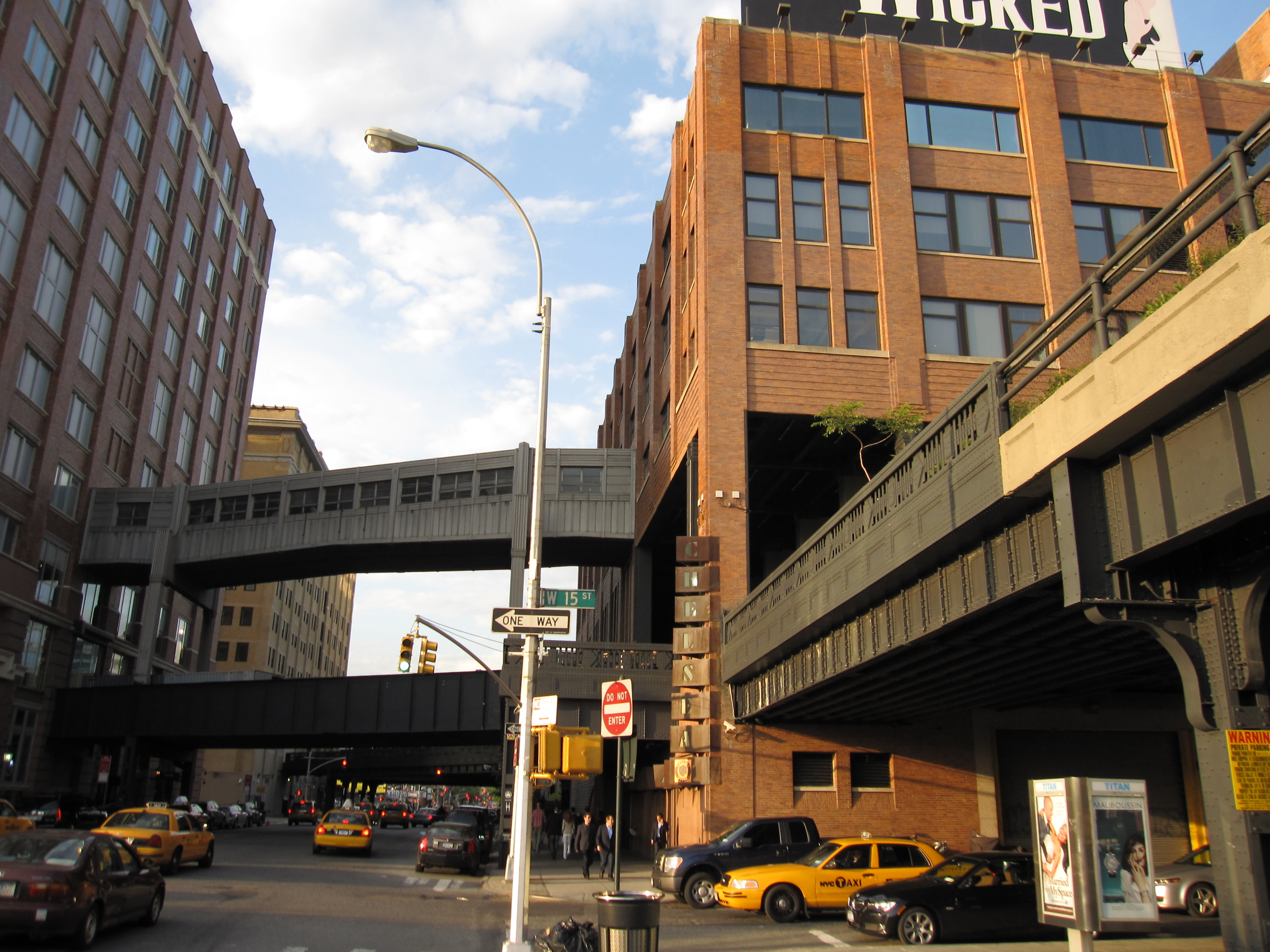
The High Line between 15th and 16th Street (where the tracks run through the second floor of the Chelsea Market building), with a side track and pedestrian bridge

At the Gansevoort Street end (which runs north–south), the stub over Gansevoort Street is named the Tiffany and Co. Foundation Overlook and was dedicated in July 2012; the foundation was a major supporter of the park. The southern terminus of the park also contains a small wooded area called the Gansevoort Woodland. The route then passes under The Standard, High Line hotel and through a passage at 14th Street. At 14th Street, the High Line splits into two sides at different elevations; the Diller-Von Furstenberg Water Feature (opened in 2010) is on the lower side, and a sundeck is on the upper side.

The route passes through the west edge of the Chelsea Market, a food hall, at 15th Street. Spurs split off at 16th Street, connecting the viaduct to the Nabisco building and the Merchants Refrigerating Company Warehouse The railroad tracks on the spurs are closed and left in situ but the trackbeds are planted with greenery. The Tenth Avenue Square, an amphitheater on the viaduct, is at 17th Street where the High Line crosses over Tenth Avenue from southeast to northwest. There is a lawn at 23rd Street, where the viaduct widens slightly to accommodate a former track spur. Between 25th and 26th Streets a ramp takes visitors 8 feet (2.4 m) above the plants and shrubs on the viaduct. Known as the Philip Falcone and Lisa Maria Falcone Flyover, after two major donors to the park, it was based on plans for a Phase 1 flyover which was never built. The flyover has a scenic overlook facing east at 26th Street, as well as several short overlooks with benches.

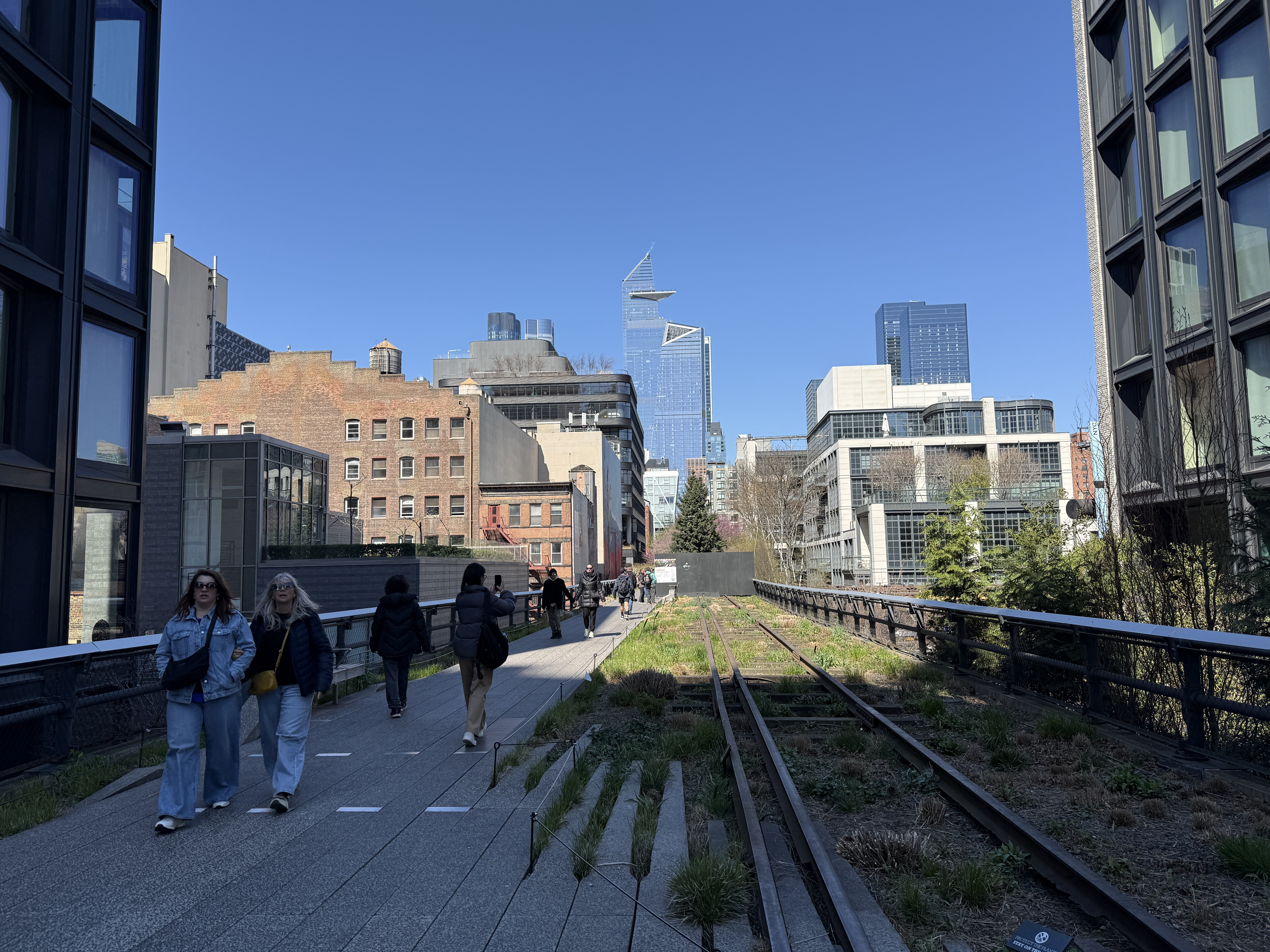
High Line looking north past 19th Street

The park then curves west to Phase 3 and merges into the Tenth Avenue Spur, which stretches over 30th Street to Tenth Avenue. The Tenth Avenue Spur is composed of three parts: the Coach Passage, with 60-foot-tall (18 m) ceilings; the High Line's largest planted garden; and a plaza with temporary art exhibitions that get replaced every 18 months. The art exhibition space is named the Plinth, an allusion to London's Fourth plinth, which also displays temporary art. Phase 3 has another ramp taking visitors above the viaduct at 11th Avenue and a play area with rail ties and the Pershing Beams (modified, silicone-covered beams and stanchions coming out of the structure), a gathering space with benches, and a set of three railroad tracks where one can walk between the rails. The play area also has a seesaw-like bench and a "chime bench", with keys which make sounds when tapped.

The section from 11th Avenue and 30th Street to the northern terminus at 34th Street divides the viaduct into two sides: a gravel walkway and an undeveloped section with rail tracks. The High Line turns north to a point just east of Twelfth Avenue. At 34th Street it curves east and descends, ending at street level midway between 12th and 11th Avenues. The 34th Street entrance has 2,561 square feet (237.9 m^{2}) of planting beds, which contain similar plantings to the rest of the park.

The High Line Moynihan Connector, a walkway from the Tenth Avenue Spur to Moynihan Train Hall at Ninth Avenue, opened in June 2023. The 1,200-foot (370 m) spur runs east along 30th Street for one block to Dyer Avenue. The span above 30th Street uses a V-shaped structure called the Woodlands Bridge, which contains a 5-foot-deep (1.5 m) planting bed. The walkway then turns north to 31st Street across the Timber Bridge, a span shaped like a Warren truss. It terminates at a public space within Manhattan West that ends at the west side of Ninth Avenue, directly across from Moynihan Train Hall.

=== Landscape design ===
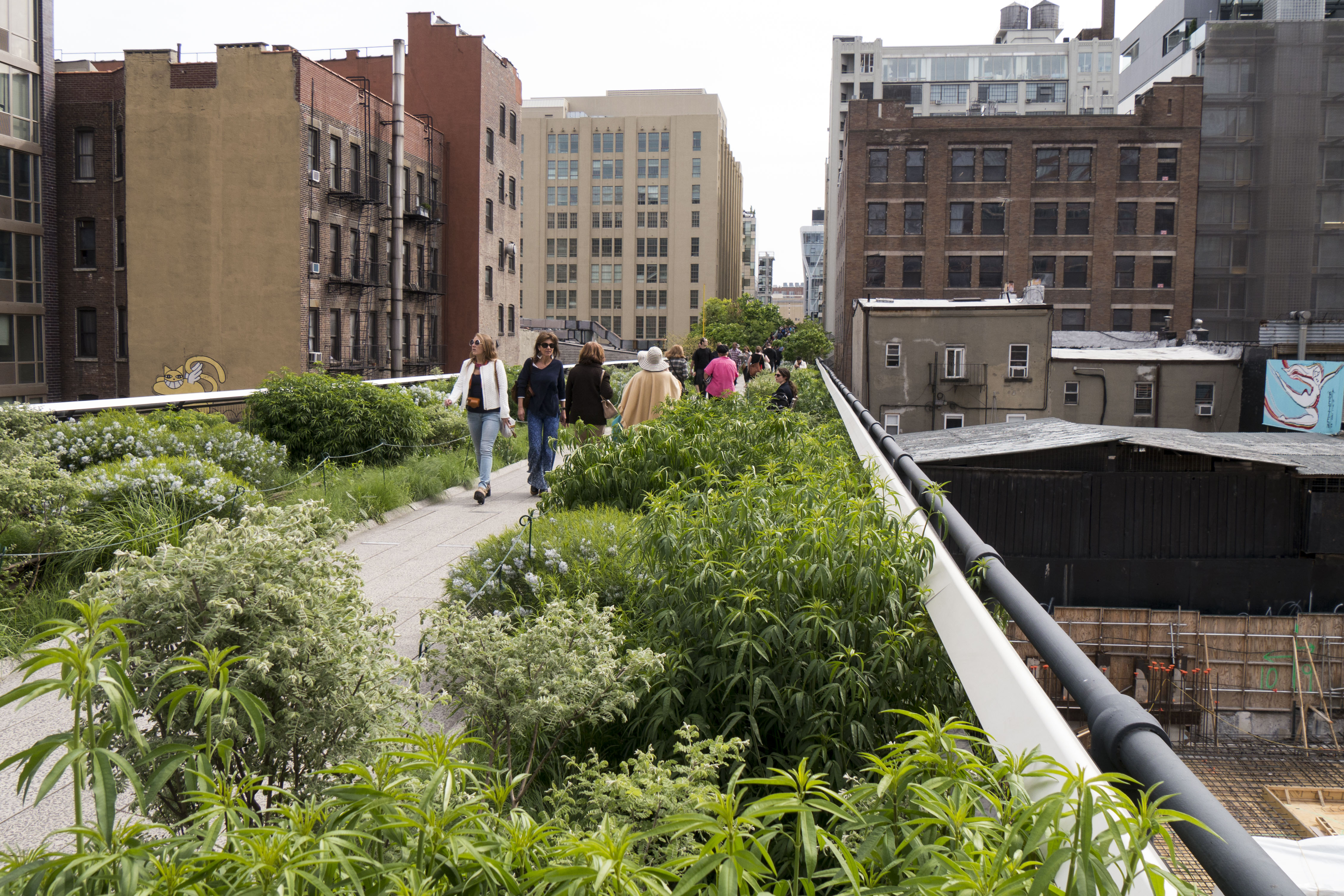
The center section, opened in June 2011

The landscape design was curated by Dutch landscape architect Piet Oudolf using natural landscaping techniques. The plantings include sturdy meadow plants (such as clump-forming grasses, liatris, and coneflowers) and scattered stands of sumac and smokebush and is not limited to native plants. At the Gansevoort Street end, a grove of mixed species of birch provides shade by late afternoon.

The High Line viaduct had 161 species of plants before it was converted into a park; the modern park has about 400 species of plants, including grasses and trees. There are about 100,000 unique specimens of plants. Each species is selected based on their appearance, in addition to how well they survive throughout the year. The park has a team of 10 horticulturists, who trim and prune the plants throughout the year to prevent overgrowth. Throughout the park, the soil has an average depth of 18 inches (460 mm). The park uses sustainable landscaping and organic lawn management techniques to maintain the space. Native fauna documented in the park include 33 native bee species, butterflies including painted ladies, and migratory birds including warblers.

=== Attractions ===
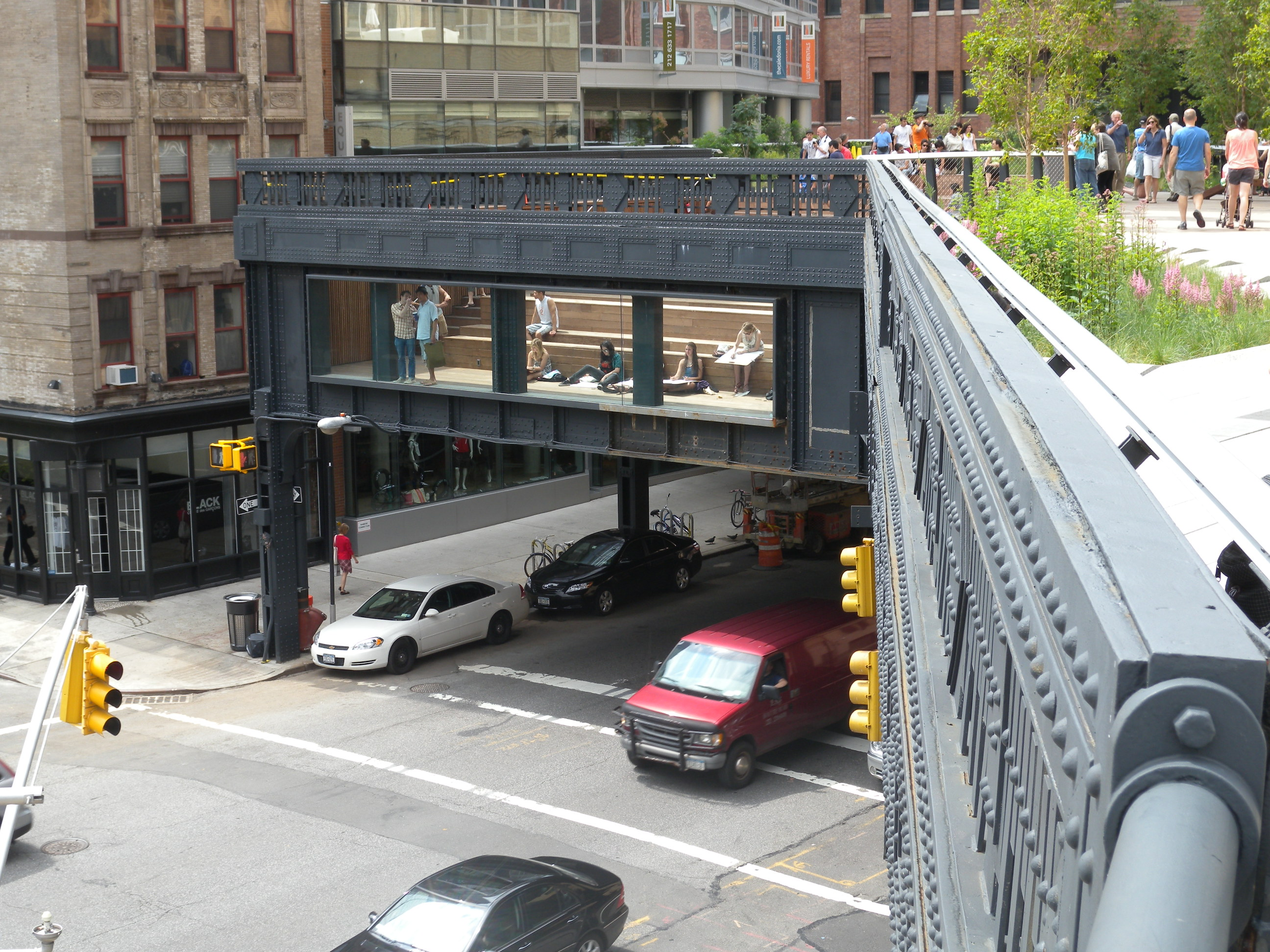
The square at Tenth Avenue and 17th Street, where the "10th Avenue Square & Overlook" provides views of the street from a window placed in the space created by removing the structure's steel beams.

The park's attractions include naturalized plantings, inspired by plants which grew on the disused tracks, and views of the city and the Hudson River. The pebble-dash concrete walkways swell and constrict, swing from side to side, and divide into concrete tines which meld the hardscape with plantings embedded in railroad-gravel mulch. "By opening the paving, we allow the plants to bleed through," said landscape architect James Corner, "almost as if the plants were colonizing the paved areas. There's a sort of blending or bleeding or suturing between the hard paving, the surface for people to stroll on, and the planting ... " Stretches of track and ties recall the High Line's former use, and portions of track are re-used for rolling lounges positioned for river views. The benches use Brazilian Ipê timber, which came from a managed forest certified by the Forest Stewardship Council. According to James Corner Field Operations, the High Line's design "is characterized by an intimate choreography of movement."

The High Line also has cultural attractions as part of a long-term plan for the park to host temporary installations and performances. Creative Time, Friends of the High Line, and the New York City Department of Parks and Recreation commissioned The River That Flows Both Ways by Spencer Finch as the inaugural art installation. It has also hosted events such as a pigeon-themed festival, as well as a series of conservation-themed activities.

==== Artwork ====
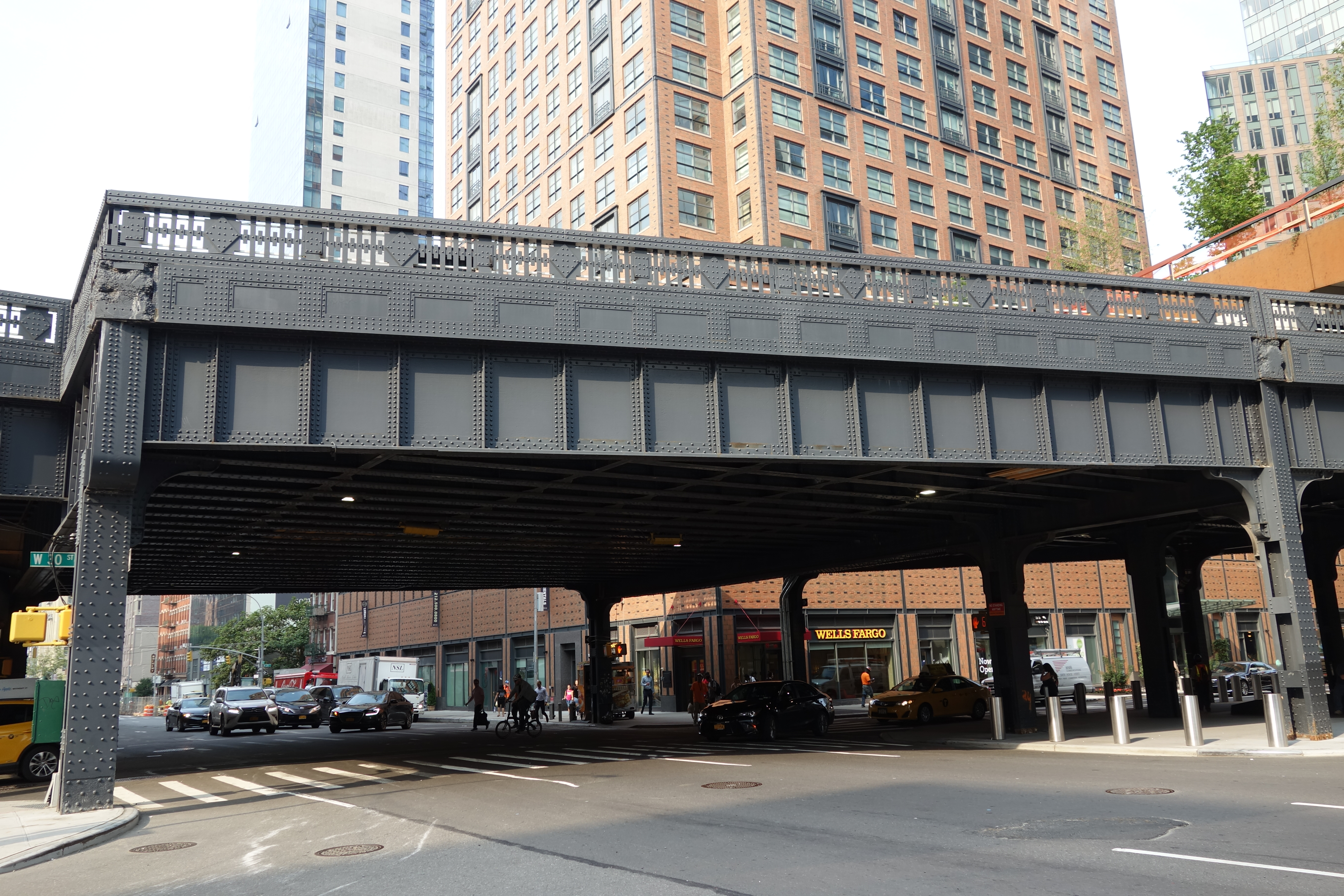
The 10th Avenue spur at 30th Street

The High Line exhibits numerous pieces of artwork through its public-artwork subsidiary High Line Art, whose curator since 2011 has been Cecilia Alemani. A mid-2010 sound installation by Stephen Vitiello was composed from bells heard throughout New York. Lauren Ross, former director of the alternative art space White Columns, was the High Line's first curator. During the construction of the second phase (between 20th and 30th Streets) several artworks were installed, including Sarah Sze's Still Life with Landscape (Model for a Habitat): a steel-and-wood sculpture near 20th and 21st Streets built as a house for fauna such as birds and butterflies. Kim Beck's Space Available was installed on the roofs of three buildings visible from the southern end. Three 20-by-12-foot (6.1 by 3.7 m) sculptures, resembling the armature of empty billboards and constructed like theater backdrops, looks three-dimensional from a distance. Also installed during the second phase of construction was Julianne Swartz's Digital Empathy, a work utilizing audio messages at restrooms, elevators, and water fountains. Maine artist Charlie Hewitt's sculpture Urban Rattle was permanently installed in 2013.

In 2012 and 2013, the Ghanaian born Nigerian artist El Anatsui's large scale sculpture Broken Bridge ll (at the time his largest work to date) fashioned from recycled pressed tin and broken mirrors was positioned on a wall on the west side of the street between 21st and 22nd streets, facing and sidelining the High Line. In 2016 Tony Matelli's controversial sculpture Sleepwalker was exhibited upon the High Line. Max Hooper Schneider's aquarium was displayed on the linear park in 2017. The next year, the High Line hosted the British sculptor Phyllida Barlow's first public commission, Prop. High Line Art also displays artwork on a billboard near 18th Street and 10th Avenue.

In 2023 the plinth commission went to the Swiss multimedia artist Pamela Rosenkranz who created a giant bright pink tree sculpture called Old Tree. An aluminum sculpture of a pigeon, Dinosaur, by Iván Argote was mounted on the High Line plinth in 2024, remaining for 18 months. In conjunction with this sculpture, in June 2025, the High Line held its first Human "Pigeon Impersonator Contest". In 2025 Mika Rottenberg's Foot Fountain (pink) was exhibited on the High Line.

== History ==
=== Rail line ===
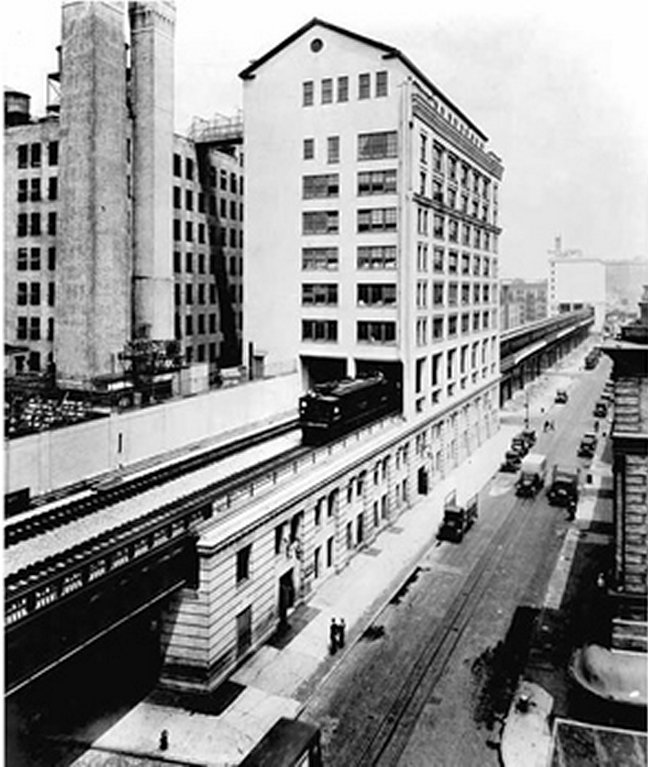
Train passing through the Bell Laboratories Building, seen from Washington Street in 1936. Only the track segment that runs through the third level of the building, and atop its two-story extension, still exists.

In 1847, the City of New York authorized the construction of railroad tracks along Tenth and Eleventh Avenues on Manhattan's West Side. The street-level tracks were used by the New York Central Railroad's freight trains, which shipped commodities such as coal, dairy products, and beef. For safety the railroad hired "West Side cowboys", men who rode horses and waved flags in front of the trains. However, so many accidents occurred between freight trains and other traffic that the nickname "Death Avenue" was given to Tenth and Eleventh Avenues. In 1910, one organization estimated that there had been 548 deaths and 1,574 injuries over the years along Eleventh Avenue.

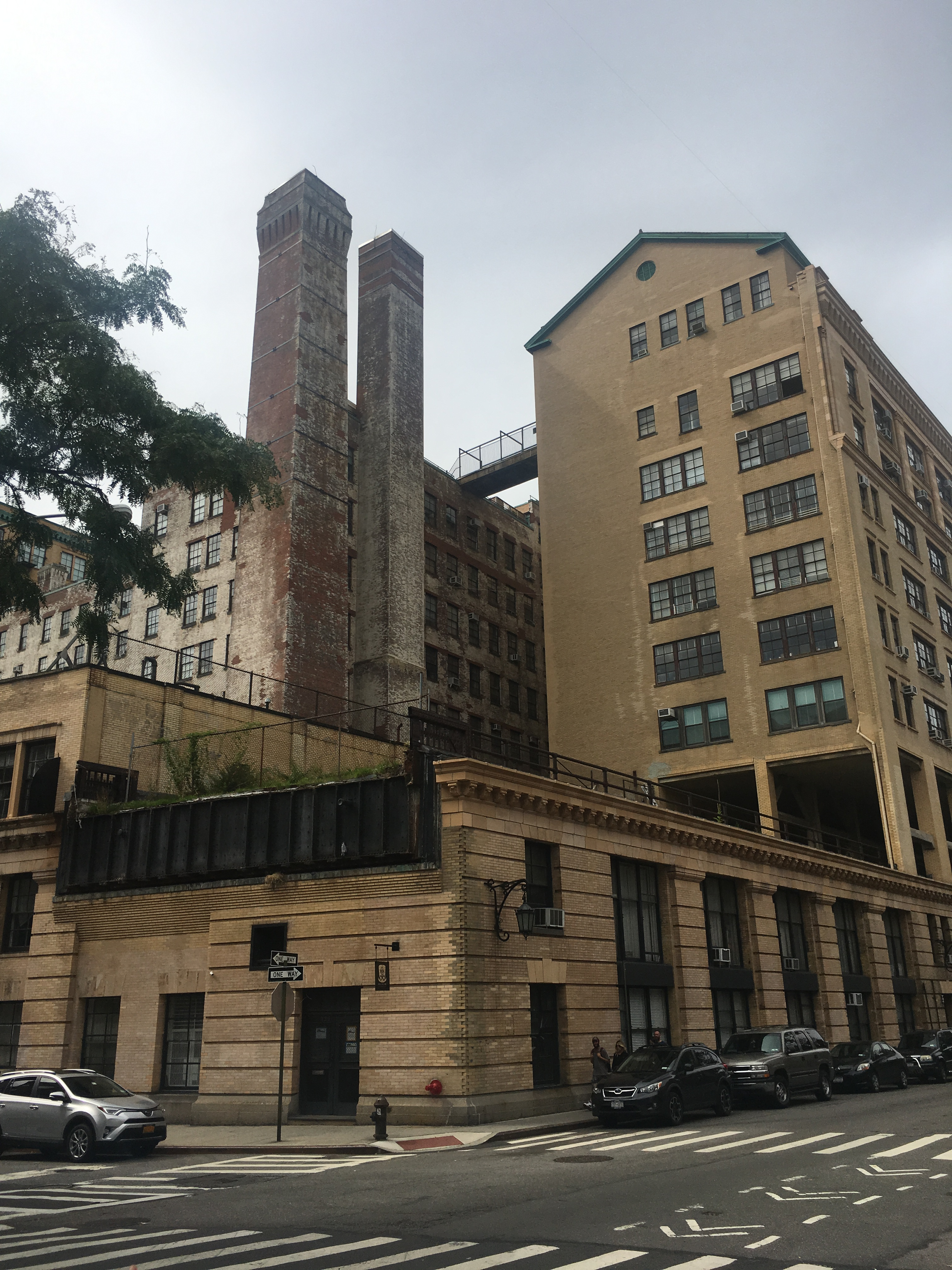
Bell Laboratories Building in 2017

Public debate about the hazard began during the early 1900s. In 1929 the city, the state, and New York Central agreed on the West Side Improvement Project, conceived by New York City park commissioner Robert Moses. The 13-mile (21 km) project eliminated 105 street-level railroad crossings, added 32 acres (13 ha) to Riverside Park, and included construction of the West Side Elevated Highway. The plans also included the construction of the St. John's Freight Terminal at Spring Street, which was completed in 1936 and replaced the street-level St. John's Park Terminal in present-day Tribeca. The West Side Improvement cost more than $150 million, worth about $2.81 billion in 2025 dollars. The last stretch of street-level track was removed from Eleventh Avenue in 1941.

The first train on the High Line viaduct, part of New York Central's West Side Line, ran along the structure in 1933. The elevated structure was dedicated on June 29, 1934, and was the first part of the West Side Improvement Project to be completed. The High Line, which originally ran from 35th Street to St. John's Freight Terminal, was designed to go through the center of blocks rather than over an avenue. As a result, the viaduct's construction necessitated the demolition of 640 buildings. It connected directly to factories and warehouses, allowing trains to load and unload inside buildings. Milk, meat, produce, and raw and manufactured goods could be transported and unloaded without disturbing street traffic. This reduced the load on the Bell Laboratories Building (which has housed the Westbeth Artists Community since 1970) and the former Nabisco plant in Chelsea Market, which were served from protected sidings in the buildings.

The line also passed under the Western Electric complex at Washington Street. Although the section still existed as of May 2008, it is not connected to the developed park.

=== Abandonment ===
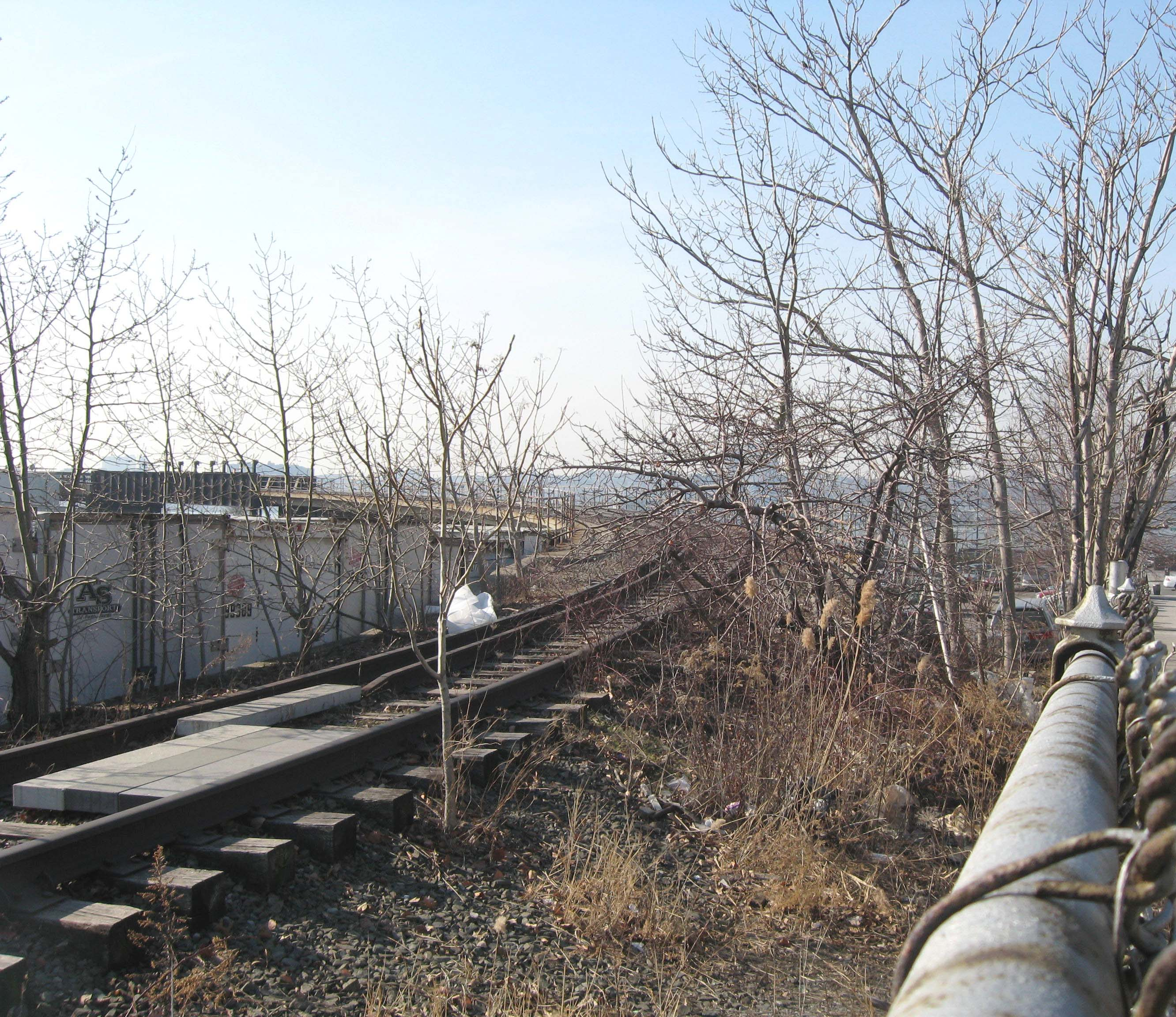
Abandoned High Line tracks in 2009 (current phase 3 section at 34th Street)

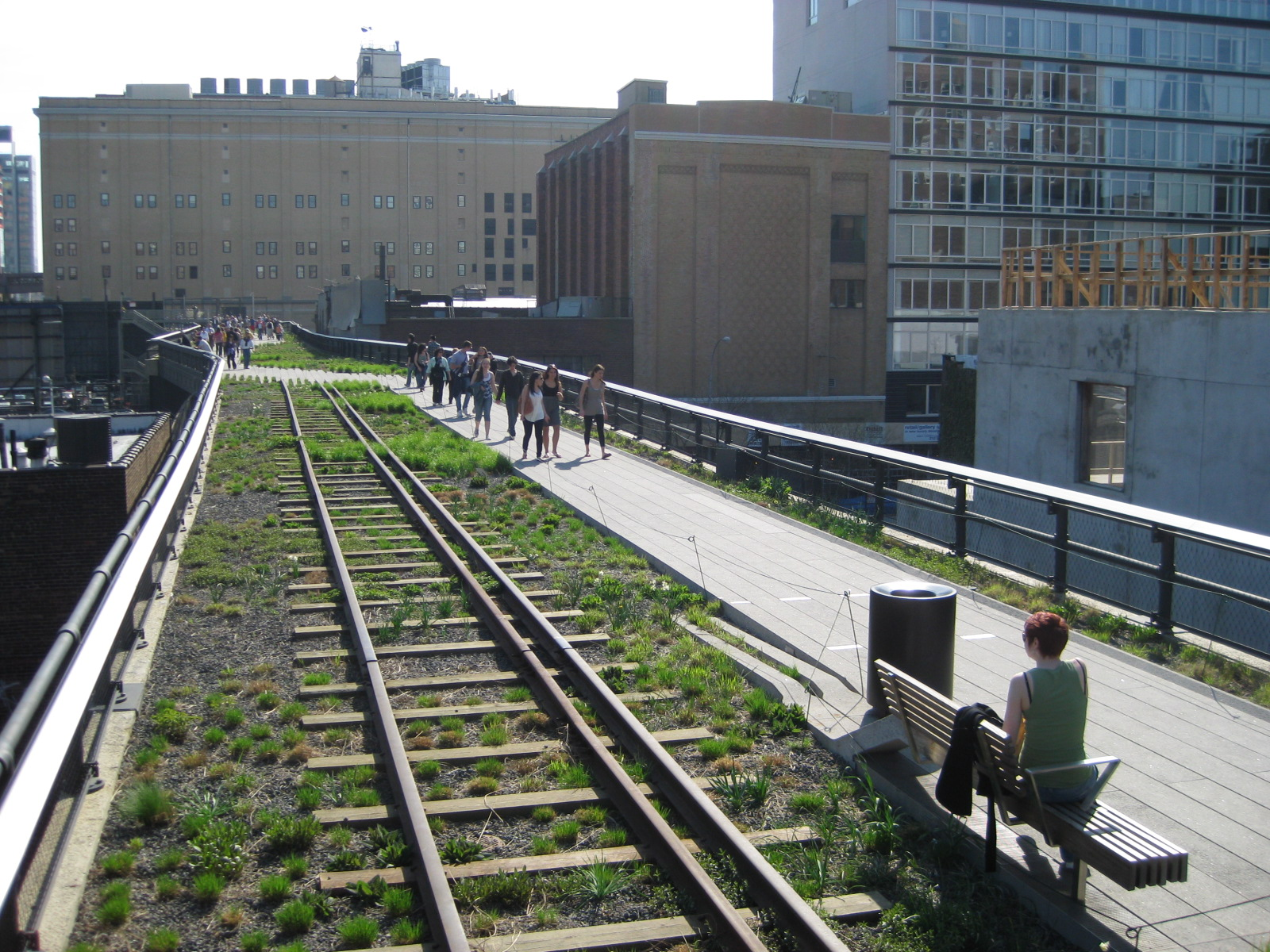
Reconstructed tracks at 20th Street, 2010

The growth of interstate trucking during the 1950s led to a drop in rail traffic throughout the U.S. St. John's Freight Terminal was abandoned in 1960, and the southernmost section of the line was demolished in the following decade due to low use. The West Village Apartments were then built on part of the former segment's right of way. The demolished section began at Bank Street and ran down Washington Street to Spring Street (just north of Canal Street).

By 1978, the High Line viaduct was used to deliver just two carloads of cargo per week. The viaduct was shut down in 1980, when owner Conrail had to disconnect the viaduct from the rest of the national rail system for a year. The closure was necessitated as a result of the construction of Javits Center at 34th Street, which required that the curve at 35th Street be rebuilt. The last train on the viaduct was a three-car consist carrying frozen turkeys. During the time the viaduct was disconnected, two large customers along the route moved to New Jersey. The curve to the viaduct from 35th Street was demolished during the construction of Javits Center and was replaced by the current curve at 34th Street. The tracks leading to the High Line were reconnected in 1981, but as there were no more customers along the route, the curve at 34th Street was never completed, and the viaduct did not see any further usage. At this point, Conrail still owned the right of way and the tracks.

During the mid-1980s, a group of property owners with land under the line lobbied for the demolition of the entire structure. Peter Obletz, a Chelsea resident, activist, and railroad enthusiast, challenged the demolition efforts in court and tried to re-establish rail service on the line. Obletz offered to buy the viaduct for $10 in order to run a small number of freight trains on the line, and Conrail accepted, mainly because demolition would have cost $5 million. However, this offer was also disputed in court. By 1988, the Metropolitan Transportation Authority was negotiating with Conrail for the possibility for using the line's right of way to construct a light rail route. These negotiations did not proceed further, and by the end of the 1980s, it was expected that the High Line would be demolished.

As part of the construction of the Empire Connection to Penn Station, which opened in spring 1991, the West Side Line tracks north of 35th Street were routed to the new Empire Connection tunnel to Penn Station. A small section of the High Line in the West Village, from Bank to Gansevoort Streets, was taken apart in 1991 despite objections by preservationists. The remaining riveted-steel elevated structure was unused and in disrepair during the 1990s, but it remained structurally sound. Around this time, it became known to urban explorers and local residents for the tough, drought-tolerant wild grasses, shrubs (such as sumac) and rugged trees which had sprung up in the gravel along the abandoned railway. The administration of mayor Rudy Giuliani planned to demolish the structure. The Interstate Commerce Commission approved plans to demolish the structure in 1992, but demolition was delayed due to disputes between various city government agencies and the railroad companies. Ownership of the viaduct ultimately passed to CSX Transportation in 1999.

=== Repurposing proposal ===
A nonprofit organization called Friends of the High Line was formed in October 1999 by Joshua David and Robert Hammond. They advocated its preservation and reuse as public open space, an elevated park or greenway similar to the Promenade Plantée in Paris. The concept also drew inspiration from Landschaftspark Duisburg-Nord, Germany—a precedent for urban and industrial repurposing in modern landscaping. The organization was initially a small community group advocating the High Line's preservation and transformation when the structure was threatened with demolition during Rudy Giuliani's second term as mayor. In 2000, CSX Transportation gave photographer Joel Sternfeld permission to photograph it for a year. Sternfeld's photographs of its meadow-like natural beauty, discussed in an episode of the documentary series Great Museums, were used at public meetings when the subject of saving the High Line was discussed. Mary Boone's art gallery, Martha Stewart, and Edward Norton hosted fundraising benefits for the High Line in 2001 and 2002, respectively. Fashion designer Diane von Fürstenberg (who had moved her New York City headquarters to the Meatpacking District in 1997) and her husband, Barry Diller, also organized fundraising events in her studio.

In 2003, Friends of the High Line sponsored a design competition that attracted more than 720 participants from 38 countries. Proposals included a sculpture garden, an elongated swimming pool, and a linear amusement park/campground. In July 2003, Edward Norton and Robert Caro hosted a benefit event at Grand Central Terminal, where the submissions for the design contest were exhibited. The same month, a bipartisan group of city officials began petitioning the federal Surface Transportation Board to hand over title to the viaduct for park use under federal railbanking law. In anticipation of this handover, the administration of Mayor Michael Bloomberg announced plans for a High Line park that September. The following year, the New York City government committed $50 million to establish the proposed park. Mayor Bloomberg and City Council speakers Gifford Miller and Christine C. Quinn were among the major supporters. Fundraising for the park raised a total of over $150 million (equivalent to $225,105,000 in 2025). The Surface Transportation Board issued a certificate of interim trail use on June 13, 2005, officially railbanking the corridor and allowing the city to remove most of the line from the national rail system. Ownership officially passed from CSX to the city that November.

=== Linear park ===
==== Reconstruction and design ====
On April 10, 2006, Mayor Bloomberg presided over a ceremony to mark the beginning of construction. The park was designed by James Corner's New York-based landscape architecture firm Field Operations and architects Diller Scofidio + Renfro, with garden design by Piet Oudolf of the Netherlands, lighting design from L'Observatoire International, and engineering design by Buro Happold and Robert Silman Associates. New York City Department of City Planning director and city planning commission chair Amanda Burden contributed to the project's development. Major supporters included Philip Falcone, Diane von Fürstenberg, Barry Diller, and von Fürstenberg's children Alexander and Tatiana von Fürstenberg. Hotel developer Andre Balazs, owner of the Chateau Marmont in Los Angeles, built the 337-room Standard Hotel straddling the High Line at West 13th Street.

The southernmost section, from Gansevoort Street to 20th Street, opened as a city park on June 8, 2009. The section includes five stairways and elevators at 14th Street and 16th Street. Around the same time, construction of the second section began. A ribbon-cutting ceremony was held on June 7, 2011, to open the second section (from 20th Street to 30th Street), with Mayor Michael Bloomberg, New York City Council speaker Christine Quinn, Manhattan Borough President Scott Stringer and Congressman Jerrold Nadler in attendance. CSX Transportation, owner of the northernmost section from 30th to 34th Streets, agreed in principle to donate the section to the city in 2011; the Related Companies, which owns development rights for the West Side Rail Yards, agreed not to tear down the spur crossing 10th Avenue. Construction on the final section was started in September 2012.

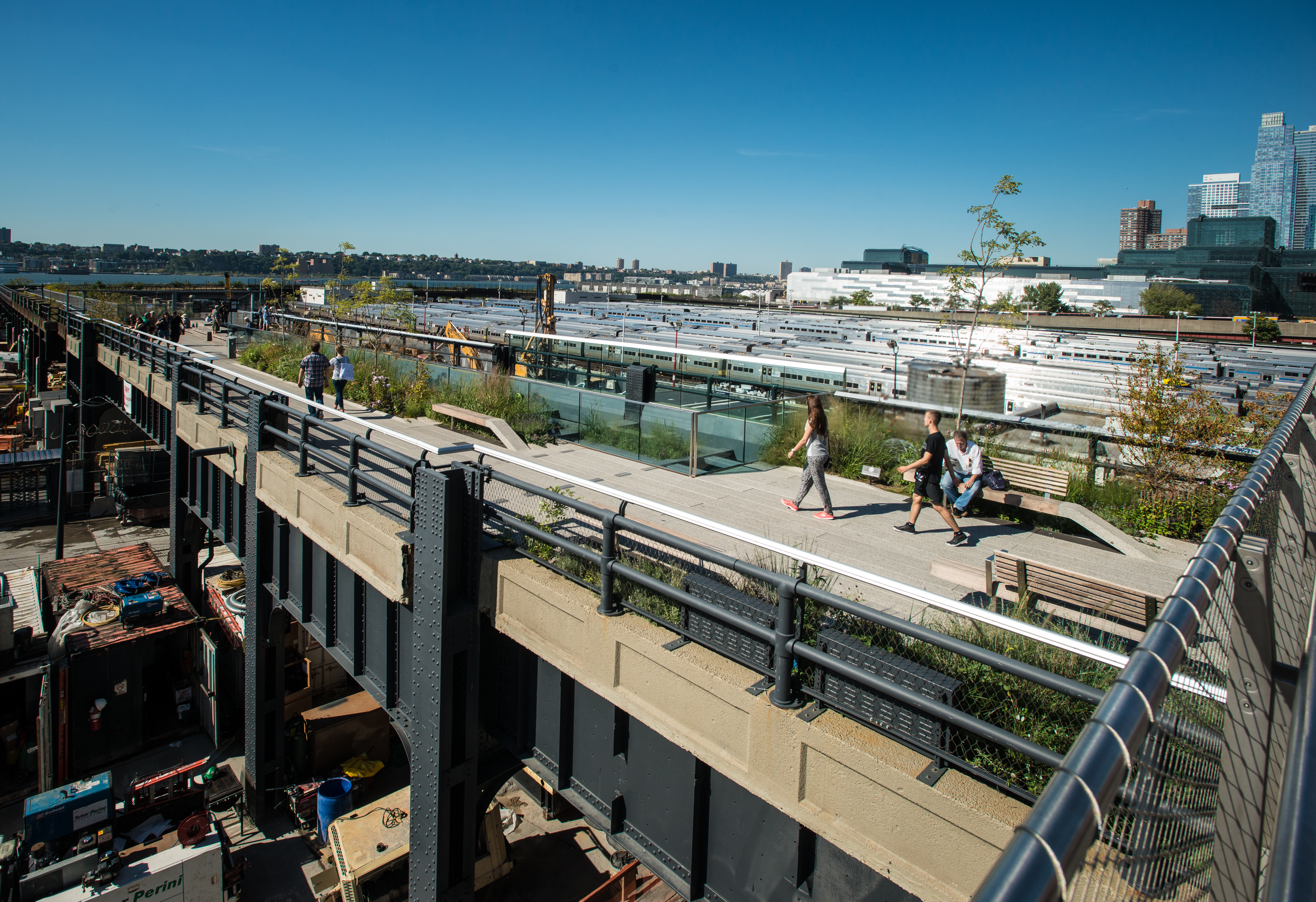
The third phase, by 30th Street, in 2015

A ribbon-cutting ceremony for the High Line's third phase was held on September 20, 2014, followed the next day by the opening of its third section and a procession down the park. The third phase, costing $76 million, was divided into two parts. The first part (costing $75 million) is from the end of phase 2 of the line to its terminus at 34th Street, west of 11th Avenue. The second part, a spur above Tenth Avenue and 30th Street, has room to install artworks curated by the public art program. The spur was scheduled to open by 2018, but was then delayed to April 2019, and later to June 2019. It opened on June 4, 2019, with the installation of a plinth as its initial artwork. It contains entrances to 10 Hudson Yards, built above the spur.

==== Subsequent developments ====
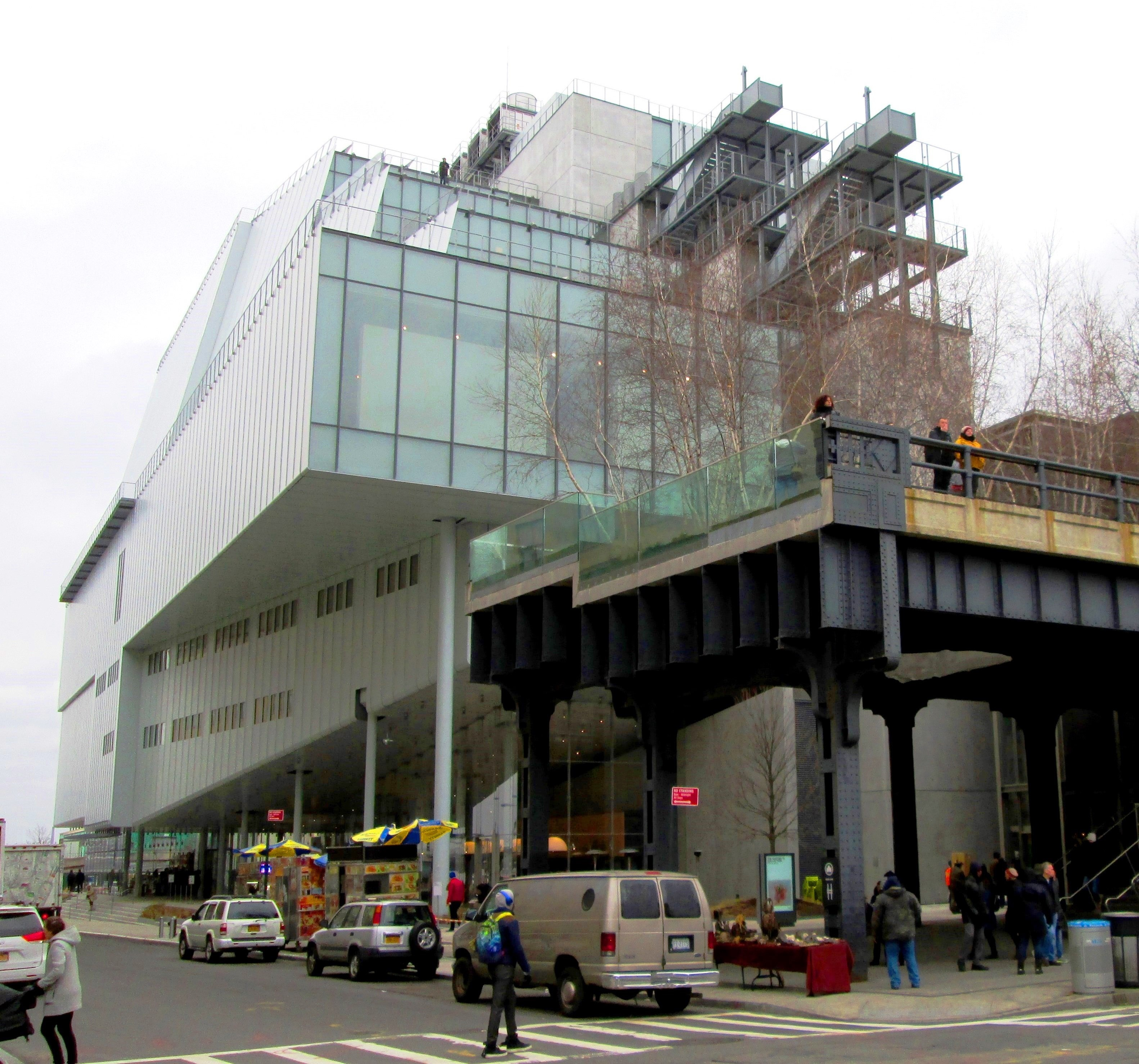
The Whitney Museum of American Art opened its new building on Gansevoort Street, next to the south end of the High Line, in 2015.

The High Line closed temporarily in early 2020 during the COVID-19 pandemic in New York City; while most parks remained open during the pandemic, the High Line is a linear park with few means to spread out for social distancing measures. The High Line reopened on July 16, 2020, with limited capacity: the section between Gansevoort and 23rd streets was only open to visitors with timed-entry passes. Visitors were able to walk only northbound from Gansevoort Street, with the other access points being for egress only.

During the pandemic, a team of 60 people hosted a Zoom call twice a week to plan an extension of the High Line. On January 11, 2021, Governor Andrew Cuomo announced proposals to extend the High Line east to Moynihan Train Hall and north to Hudson River Park. The 1,200-foot (370 m) Moynihan Connector was planned to cost $60 million and run east to Ninth Avenue. A second spur would diverge from the Phase 3 walkway at 34th Street, running north to the Javits Center and then turning west to cross the West Side Highway to Hudson River Park. When the spurs were announced, neither of the projects had been funded. As of September 2021, the Moynihan Connector was funded and was projected to be completed in early 2023 at a cost of $50 million.

A groundbreaking for the Moynihan Connector occurred on February 24, 2022, although major construction did not begin until later the same year. The Moynihan Connector opened on June 22, 2023. The final landscape feature of the original High Line—the Rail Yard Preserve at 34th Street, also designed by Oudolf—was completed in October 2026.

== Friends of the High Line ==
The line is maintained by Friends of the High Line, which was founded by Joshua David and Robert Hammond. The organization is credited with saving the structure by rallying public support for the park and convincing Mayor Michael Bloomberg's administration in 2002 to support the project by filing a request with the Surface Transportation Board to create a public trail on the site. Friends of the High Line played a role in the line's visual aesthetic, holding a competition in conjunction with the city of New York in 2004 to determine the design team which would lead the project. Since the park's opening in 2009, Friends of the High Line has had an agreement with the New York City Department of Parks and Recreation to serve as its primary steward. The organization is responsible for the daily operation and maintenance of the park, with an annual budget of over $5 million. It has an annual operating budget of $11.5 million, in addition to capital construction and management and fundraising expenses.

Friends of the High Line has raised more than $150 million in public and private funds toward the construction of the first two sections of the park. Unlike the first two phases, to which the city significantly contributed, Friends of the High Line was responsible for raising funds for phase three (an estimated $35 million). The organization raises over 90 percent of the High Line's annual operating budget from private donations. When the city donated $5 million to the High Line in 2012, there was criticism that most city parks had received less funding that year, especially since Friends of the High Line had raised an extra $85 million that year.

The organization has an office on Washington Street, near the park's southern end. It has 80 full-time, year-round employees and about 150 full-time summer employees. Friends of the High Line has been run by president and co-founder Josh David after executive director Jenny Gersten stepped down in 2014. Co-founder Robert Hammond served as executive director until he stepped down in February 2013. Friends of the High Line has a 38-member board of directors consisting of many New York City businesspeople and philanthropists, including Amanda Burden of Bloomberg Associates, Jane Lauder of Estée Lauder Companies, Jon Stryker of the Arcus Foundation and Darren Walker of the Ford Foundation. In 2017, Friends of the High Line received the Veronica Rudge Green Prize in Urban Design from Harvard University's Graduate School of Design, for the development of High Line.

== Impact ==
Since its opening, the High Line has become one of the most popular visitors attractions in New York City. By September 2014, the park had nearly five million visitors annually, and in 2019, it had eight million visitors per year. Most of these visits came from tourists; a 2019 study found that tourists made up four-fifths of the High Line's total visitor count. Residents quoted in The New York Times stated that the park has become a "tourist-clogged catwalk" since it opened, and one critic called it a "tourist-clogged cattle chute". The New York Times called the High Line "one of the best-known naturalistic gardens anywhere" upon the park's 15th anniversary in 2024.

=== Gentrification and development ===
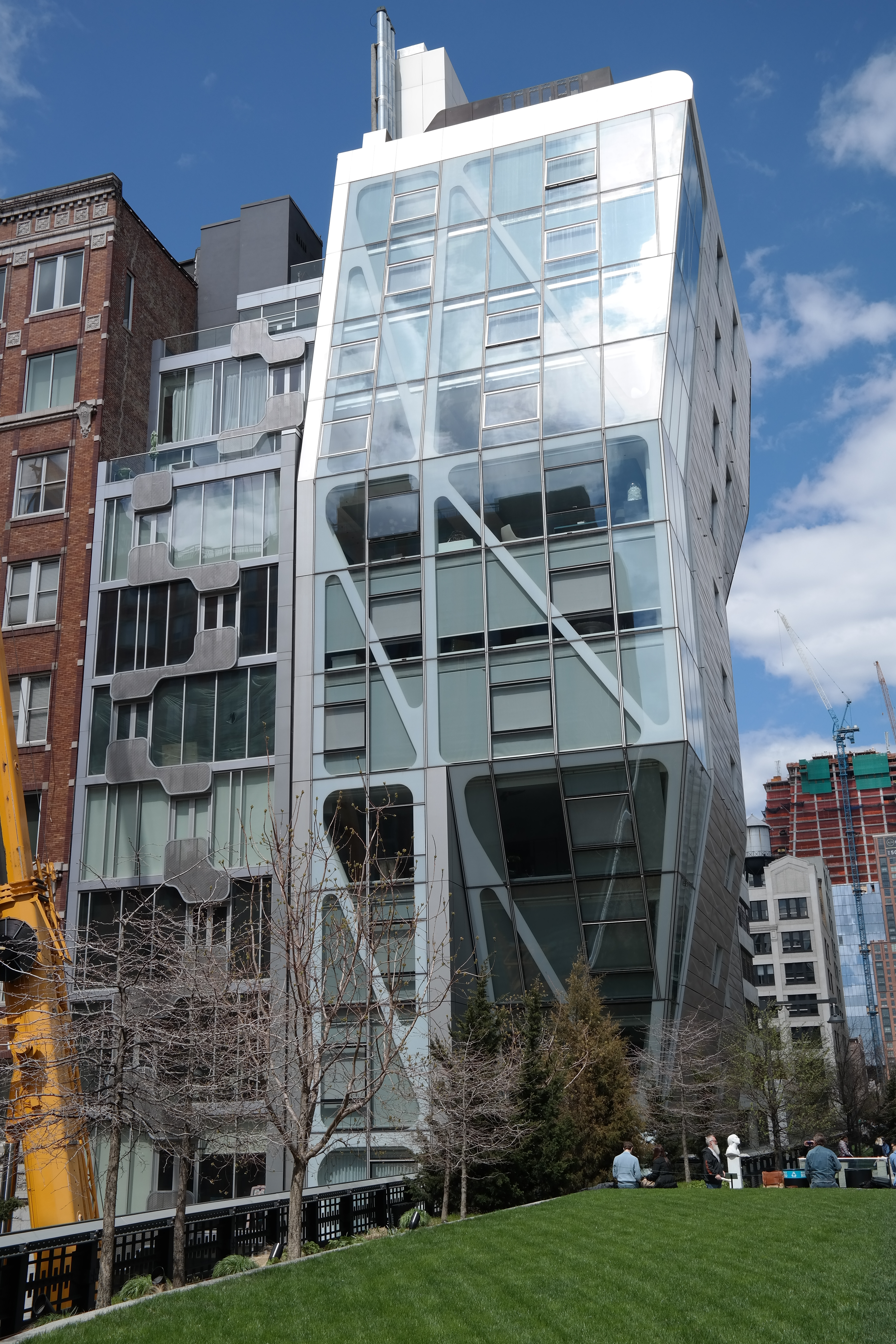
The luxury apartment building HL23 by Neil M. Denari Architects opened in 2010.

The recycling of the rail line into an urban park and tourist attraction has revitalized Chelsea, which was "gritty" and in generally poor condition during the late twentieth century. It has also spurred real-estate development in the neighborhoods along the line. According to mayor Bloomberg, by 2009 more than 30 projects were planned or under construction nearby, and by 2016 more than 11 projects were under construction. It has also helped raise the value of properties directly adjacent to the High Line by an average of 10 percent over properties a few blocks away. At least 20 properties abutting the High Line have sold for at least $10 million since the park's opening in 2009, with an apartment in a building directly adjacent to the park selling for an average of $6 million. Apartments located near Phase 1 of the High Line are, on average, more than twice as costly as those between Seventh and Eighth Avenues (two blocks east). In August 2016, the park continued to increase real-estate values along it in an example of the halo effect.

Residents who have bought apartments next to the High Line adapted to its presence in various ways, but most responses were positive. However, many established businesses in west Chelsea have closed due to loss of their neighborhood customer base or rent increases. Among the businesses that have closed are gas stations and auto-repair stores, as well as a parochial school. Chelsea has significant racial-minority communities, many of whom live in two large public housing developments. In a 2017 interview, Friends of the High Line co-founder Robert Hammond said that he "failed" the community; the High Line did not fulfill its original purpose of serving the surrounding neighborhood, which had become demographically divided around the park.

Due to the High Line's popularity, several museums were proposed or built along its path. The Dia Art Foundation considered (but rejected) a proposal to build a museum at the Gansevoort Street terminus. On that site, the Whitney Museum has built a new home for its collection of American art. The building, designed by Renzo Piano, opened on May 1, 2015.

=== Crime ===
Crime has been low in the park. Shortly after the second section opened in 2011, The New York Times reported that there had been no reports of major crimes (such as assault or robbery) since the first phase opened two years earlier. Parks Enforcement Patrols have written summonses for infractions of park rules such as walking dogs or riding bicycles on the walkway at a lower rate than in Central Park. Park advocates attributed this to the visibility of the High Line from surrounding buildings, a feature of urban life espoused by author Jane Jacobs nearly fifty years before. According to Joshua David, "Empty parks are dangerous ... Busy parks are much less so. You're virtually never alone on the High Line." In a review of the Highliner restaurant—which has now reverted to its previous name, the Empire Diner—Ariel Levy wrote in The New Yorker that... "The new Chelsea that is emerging on weekends as visitors flood the elevated park ... [is] touristy, overpriced, and shiny."

=== Projects in other cities ===
The High Line's success in New York City has encouraged leaders in other cities such as Chicago mayor Rahm Emanuel, who sees it as "a symbol and catalyst" for gentrifying neighborhoods. Several cities nationwide have plans to renovate railroad infrastructure into parkland, including Philadelphia's Rail Park, Atlanta's Beltline, and Chicago's Bloomingdale Trail. The High Line has helped pioneer the creation of elevated parks worldwide. In Queens, the Queensway (a proposed aerial rail trail) is being considered for reactivation along the right-of-way of the Long Island Rail Road's former Rockaway Beach Branch. Other cities around the world have planned elevated rails-to-trails parks in what has been called the "High Line effect". The conversion of the Tokyo Expressway in Tokyo was also inspired by the High Line.

According to some estimates, it costs substantially less to redevelop an abandoned urban rail line into a linear park than to demolish it. Landscape architect James Corner (who led the High Line's design team) noted that "The High Line is not easily replicable in other cities," however, observing that building a "cool park" requires a "framework" of neighborhoods around it to succeed.

In 2016, Friends of the High Line launched the High Line Network to support similar infrastructure re-use projects being developed in other cities. As of 2017, there are 19 projects in the network, including River LA, the Atlanta Beltline, Crissy Field, Dequindre Cut, the Lowline, Klyde Warren Park, the Bentway, Bergen Arches, Destination Crenshaw and the Trinity River Project.

=== Popular culture ===
The line was depicted in a variety of media before its redevelopment. The 1979 film Manhattan includes a shot of the High Line as director and star Woody Allen speaks the first line: "Chapter One. He adored New York City." Director Zbigniew Rybczyński shot the music video for Art of Noise's single, "Close (to the Edit)" on the line in 1984.

In 2001 (two years after the formation of the Friends of the High Line), photographer Joel Sternfeld documented the High Line's flora and dilapidation in his book, Walking the High Line. The book also contains essays by writer Adam Gopnik and historian John R. Stilgoe. Sternfeld's work was regularly discussed and exhibited during the 2000s as the rehabilitation project developed. Alan Weisman's 2007 book, The World Without Us, cites the High Line as an example of the reappearance of the wild in an abandoned area. Kinetics & One Love's 2009 song, "The High Line", uses the line (before its conversion to a park) as an example of nature's reclamation of man-made structures.

A number of films and television programs have utilized the High Line since the park opened. In 2011, the television series Louie used it as a setting for one of the title character's dates. Other works with scenes on the High Line since its conversion include The Simpsons' 2012 episode "Moonshine River" and the 2012 film What Maisie Knew.

== See also ==
- 10-Minute Walk
- Bloomingdale Trail
- Camden Highline
- Coulée verte René Dumont, Paris, France
- List of linear parks
- List of rail trails in the United States
- Min Hi Line
- Rose de Cherbourg
- Park conservancy

=== Neighborhoods, developments, and places nearby ===
- Meatpacking District, Manhattan
- Chelsea, Manhattan
  - Whitney Museum
- Hell's Kitchen, Manhattan
- Hudson Yards Redevelopment Project
  - 15 Hudson Yards
  - The Shed (Hudson Yards)
  - West Side Rail Yard
