= Bell Laboratory =

Bell Laboratory may refer to:

- Bell Labs, owned by Nokia, a former subsidiary of AT&T, founded originally as Bell Telephone Laboratories in 1925
- Bell Laboratories Building, in Manhattan, New York City, US
- Volta Laboratory and Bureau, founded in 1880–1881, also known as the Bell Laboratory, created in Washington, D.C. by Alexander Graham Bell
