= Rose de Cherbourg =

Suspended urban walk in Paris La Défense

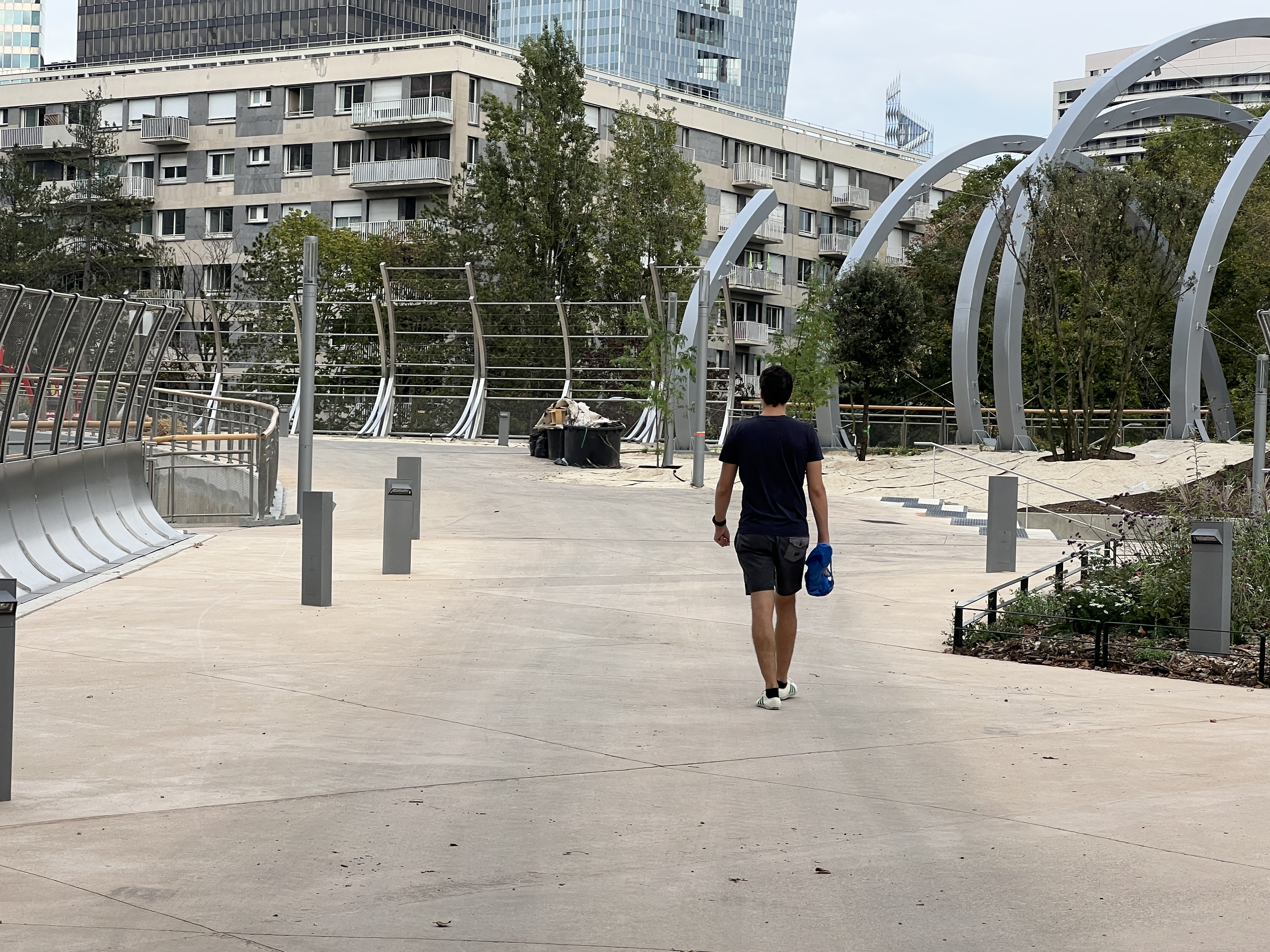

- Location within Paris Rose de Cherbourg (France)

General information
- Status: Completed
- Location: Puteaux, France
- Construction started: 2020; 6 years ago
- Completed: 2023; 3 years ago

Website
- parisladefense.com/en/discover/projects/rose-de-cherbourg

The Rose de Cherbourg area is a suspended urban promenade inaugurated in September 2023 in the La Défense district in Greater Paris.

Located above the road interchange and around the Hekla Tower, this area also includes a children's play area.

It is inspired by the High Line in New York.

A 75 meters residence called "Campusea" is located in the area.

Its name comes from the fact that the structure spans the Nationale 13 which connects Paris, from Porte Maillot, to Cherbourg (Manche).

Rose de Cherbourg "Campusea" residence

Rose de Cherbourg "Campusea" residence at night
