= Charlie Hewitt (artist) =

New York and Maine-based visual artist

Charlie Hewitt (August 21, 1946) is an American painter, printmaker, sculptor and public artist based in Maine. He is known for his public art projects in Maine and New York.

== Biography ==
Hewitt was born into a large working-class French Canadian family in Lewiston, Maine on August 21, 1946, and he was raised in Lewiston/Auburn and Brunswick, Maine. He earned his college degree at Concord College in Athens, West Virginia. He moved to New York City in 1969 and studied at the New York Studio School under artists Philip Guston, David Hare, and Elaine de Kooning.

In 1984, Hewitt returned to Maine, where he created prints at the Vinalhaven Press. He transformed a former florist shop and greenhouse in Portland into a studio known as the “Electric Greenhouse,” which houses his light sculptures.

Hewitt maintains his studio in New York City, where he is represented by Jim Kempner Fine Art.

== Work ==
Hewitt is known for his public sculptures installed and displayed throughout various locations on the East Coast. Hopeful is a work consisting of a series of light sculptures and signs installed in dozens of locations in several states from Maine to Maryland. It began in 2019 as a commissioned piece for contemporary art gallery Speedwell Projects for the roof of their headquarters in Portland, Maine. Hewitt has described the sculpture as a reaction to the increased polarization of the world. Hewitt’s Urban Rattle is one of only a few permanently installed art pieces along the High Line in New York City.

Hewitt’s painting and printmaking primarily references Pop art. He has explored digital art as well, creating NFTs from original drawings.

Works of art by Hewitt are in the collections of the Metropolitan Museum of Art, Whitney Museum of American Art, Museum of Modern Art, and Brooklyn Museum in New York; the Library of Congress in Washington, DC; the MIT List Visual Arts Center in Cambridge, MA; and several museums in Maine.

== Selected Solo Exhibitions ==
2023 "Bright Screens and Electric Dreams," Moss Galleries, Portland, ME

2022 "Light Up," Heather Gaudio Fine Art, New Canaan, CT

2022 "New Work," Jim Kempner Fine Art, New York

2019 "Abstract Paintings and Electric Dreams," Courthouse Gallery, Ellsworth, ME

2018 Icon Contemporary Art, Brunswick, ME

2012 "Charlie Hewitt: Cut and Printed," Center for Contemporary Printmaking, Norwalk, CT

2006 Farnsworth Museum, Rockland, ME

2006 "Scrape, Cut, Gouge, Bite, Print: The Graphic Work of Charlie Hewitt 1976–2006," Bates College Museum, Lewiston, ME

1999 "Lasting Impressions: Contemporary Prints from the Bruce Brown Collection," Portland Museum of Art, ME

1997 "In Print: Contemporary Artists at the Vinalhaven Press," Portland Museum of Art, ME and McMullen Museum of Art, Boston College

1996 Fletcher Priest Gallery, Worcester, MA

== Public Sculpture Installations ==
Hopeful, various locations, including Lexington Park, MD (2022); Augusta, ME (2021); Bangor, ME (2020); Bates Mills, Lewiston, ME; (2019); Speedwell Projects, Portland, ME (2019)

French Rose “Beauté Française,” Auburn, Maine (2022)

Dallas Boot, Primera Properties, Plano, TX (2021); and Towne Square Place II, Portland, ME (2021)

Portland Rattle, 511 Congress Street, Portland ME (2015)

L/A Rattle, L/A Arts, Lewiston, ME (2015)

Brooklyn Swing, Primera Companies, Dallas, TX (2013)

Urban Rattle, Equity Builders for Ten23 Apartments (High Line), New York, NY (2013)

== Selected Grants and Awards ==
1998 New York Foundation for the Arts, Painting

1997 New York Foundation for the Arts, Drawings, Prints

1974 New York State Council of the Arts, CAPS Grant

== Selected publications ==
Charlie Hewitt: Sculpture. New York: Jim Kempner Fine Art, 2010 (OCLC 731037489).

Charlie Hewitt: Drawings for Illuminations. New York: Jim Kempner Fine Art, 2010 (OCLC 693188783).

Charlie Hewitt: Woodcuts. New York: Jim Kempner Fine Art, 2009 (OCLC 693110217).

Becker, David. Scrape, Cut, Gouge, Bite, Print: The Graphic Work of Charlie Hewitt, 1976–2006. Lewiston, ME: Bates College Museum of Art, 2007 (ISBN 0977357015).

Beem, Edgar Allan, and Charlie Hewitt. Charlie Hewitt at Work: Twenty Years of Paintings, Sculpture and Works on Paper. Rockland, ME: Farnsworth Art Museum, 2006 (ISBN 0918749220).

Gallant, Aprile, and Bruce Brown. Lasting Impressions: Contemporary Prints from the Bruce Brown Collection. Portland, ME: Portland Museum of Art, 2000 (ISBN 0916857190).

Gallant, Aprile, and David P. Becker. In Print : Contemporary Artists at the Vinalhaven Press. Portland, ME: Portland Museum of Art, 1997 (ISBN 0916857093).

== Selected Permanent Collections ==
Bates College Museum of Art, Lewiston, ME

Brooklyn Museum, Brooklyn, NY

Chase Manhattan Bank, New York, NY

Colby College Museum of Art, Waterville, ME

Farnsworth Museum of Art, Rockland, ME

Harvard University Art Museums, Cambridge, MA

Library of Congress

Metropolitan Museum of Art, New York, NY

MIT List Visual Arts Center, Cambridge, MA

Portland Museum of Art, Portland, ME

Prudential Insurance, New York, NY

Rollins Museum of Art, Orlando, FL

State University of New York, Binghamton, NY

Whitney Museum of American Art, New York, NY
