= Barnaby Ruhe =

American painter and boomeranger

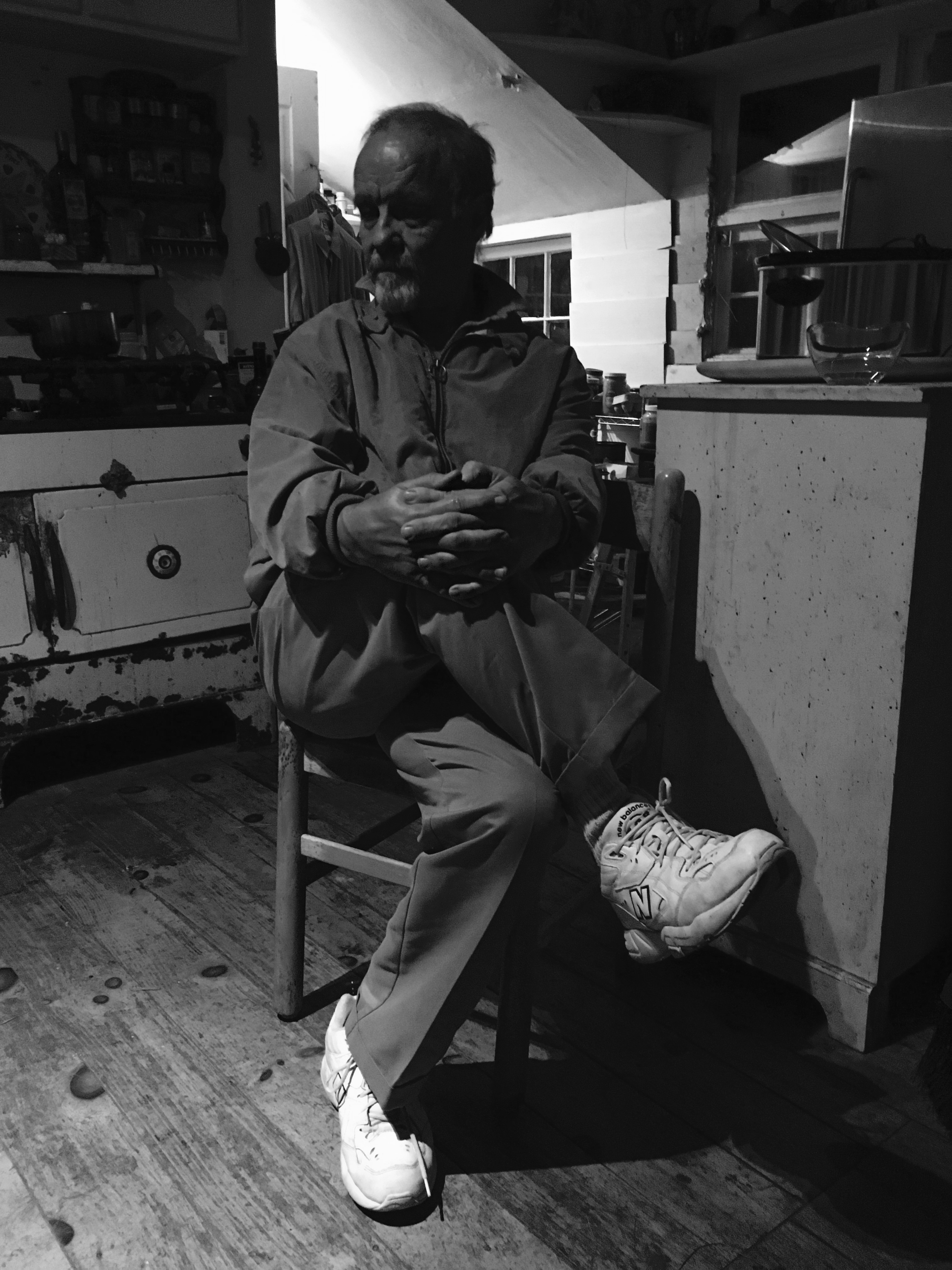
Ruhe in 2016

Barnaby Ruhe is an American artist and university academic who has described himself as a bodhisattva. Ruhe teaches at New York University's Gallatin School of Individualized Study, and is perhaps best known for his painting marathons, otherwise known as endurance feats. His New York City studio is located within the Westbeth Artists Community.

== Early life and education ==
Ruhe obtained his B.S. from the U.S. Naval Academy in 1968, his M.F.A. from the Maryland Institute College of Art in 1975, and his PhD from New York University in 1989 in shamanism and art practice, a degree which combined psychology, anthropology, art history, phenomenology, and studio art.

== Career ==
Ruhe was senior editor of Art/World newspaper in the 1980s and 1990s and wrote the first New York City reviews of work by Francesco Clemente and The Starn Twins, as well as essays on Francisco de Goya, Henri Matisse, Andy Warhol, and Joseph Beuys. Ruhe currently serves on the board of Artists Talk on Art. A romantic artist, he incorporates sentiment, gesture and psychic journeying into his paintings, and he runs shaman healing workshops at Shamandome Camp at the Burning Man festival each summer. In an interview with Alexander Steedman Ruhe however describes himself as being more of a bodhisattva than a shaman in life practice in remarking ... "I am not a Shaman. I am a Bodhisattva.”,,, “a person brought on life to entertain the souls of all the other people out of love and sheer delight" ...

Ruhe is also well known for his yearly recreation of the persona of an artist in the NYC Halloween Parade. He has taken on the role of such artists as Pablo Picasso, Vincent van Gogh, Hieronymus Bosch, and Michelangelo, all executed while painting in tandem with moving down the avenue during the celebration. Ruhe also appeared on the television program "That's Incredible" demonstrating his "William Tell" trick which consists of splitting an apple on his own head with a self-propelled boomerang. Ruhe has been the Captain of the United States Boomerang World Cup team. Baranaby's uncle Ben Ruhe was a foremost expert on the Boomerang and a noted author on the subject, having penned the volume "Boomerangs".

Ruhe's work was the subject of a solo exhibition Regenesis at the Baum School of Art in Allentown, Pennsylvania which ran from September 20 until October 20, 2018.
