= Spencer Holst =

American writer and storyteller (1926–2001)

Spencer Holst (July 7, 1926 – November 23, 2001) was an American writer and storyteller.

Although he published several collections of stories and volumes of translations, Holst was known primarily for the live performances of his work that he regularly conducted, particularly in the New York City area, in a distinctive mellifluous, rhythmically cadenced voice. In his heyday he was often heard on New York's listener-sponsored radio station, WBAI.

For many years until his death, he lived at Westbeth Artists Community in NYC. In addition to presenting readings there, he exhibited his watercolour paintings, many based on invented calligraphic motifs. The paintings were often shown with lengthy titles attached, some were small stories in themselves.

The typical Holst story might be a gentle but a twisted fable, such as the tale of a frog who, having become addicted to morphine during a laboratory experiment, was rejected by the woman whose kiss transformed him back into a prince because, after all, he was only a junkie. Holst also wrote a number of paragraph-length prose pieces, which distilled a brief scene or anecdote into a koan.

== Selected works ==
- Thirteen Essays / Sixty Drawings (1960) [Self Published] by Spencer Holst and drawings by Beatte Wheeler
- On Demons (chapbook) (1970)
- The Language of Cats and Other Stories (1971) ISBN 0841500797
- Spencer Holst Stories (1976) ISBN 0818006226 Winner of the Rosenthal Literary Award by the American Academy of Arts & Letters
- Something to Read to Someone/16 Drawings (with Beate Wheeler) (1980) ISBN 0930794346
- The Zebra Storyteller (1993)ISBN 0882681249
- Brilliant Silence (2000) ISBN 1581770553
