= Robert Hammond (High Line) =

Robert Hammond (born 1969) is a co-founder and the executive director of Friends of the High Line, which developed New York City's High Line.

== Background ==
Originally from San Antonio, Texas, Hammond graduated with honors in history from Princeton University. Before working on the High Line, Hammond was a consultant for the Times Square Alliance, for the Alliance for the Arts and National Cooperative Bank (NCB), and an ex-officio trustee of the Metropolitan Museum of Art.

== Honors and awards ==
He won the Rome Prize from the American Academy in Rome in 2009. In 2012, he was awarded an honorary doctorate from The New School. In 2013, the National Building Museum awarded Hammond and his business partner Joshua David the Vincent Scully Prize for "excellence in ... historic preservation".
