= Tour Hekla =

Skyscraper in La Défense, France

- The tower in 2024
- Interactive map of the Tour Hekla area

General information
- Status: Completed
- Type: Commercial offices
- Architectural style: Contemporary
- Location: Rue de la Demi-Lune, Puteaux, France
- Coordinates: 48.88890°N 2.23531°E
- Construction started: May 2018; 8 years ago
- Completed: December 2022; 3 years ago
- Owner: Amundi Immobilier; Primonial REIM

Height
- Roof: 220 m (720 ft)

Technical details
- Floor count: 48
- Floor area: 76,000 m^{2} (820,000 sq ft)

Design and construction
- Architect: Ateliers Jean Nouvel
- Developer: AG Real Estate; Hines
- Engineer: Deerns

Website
- tour-hekla.com

Tour Hekla is an office skyscraper in the La Défense district of Greater Paris. Built between 2018 and 2022, the tower stands at 220 m (720 ft) tall with 48 floors and is the current third tallest building in France. Named after the Icelandic volcano Hekla, the building is located in the Rose de Cherbourg area. It was designed by French architect Jean Nouvel.

== History ==
The building received its building permit in June 2016. Construction began in May 2018. Since completion in December 2022 it is the second-tallest building in France, only surpassed in height by Tour First, the tallest tower in the La Défense district. It's the third tallest structure in Paris under the Eiffel Tower.

On April 13, 2012, an exclusivity agreement for the realization of the project was signed between Epadesa and the Hines/AG Real Estate/Gecina group.

The Hekla Tower received its building permit in June 2016. On December 13, 2017, the Hines and AG Real Estate groups, which have developed the project so far, have signed the sale of the Hekla tower in its future state of completion (VEFA) to Amundi Immobilier and Primonial REIM, which plans for work to begin in June 2018.

In April 2018, the public development establishment for La Défense announced the groundbreaking of the site for April 30, with the start of the foundation work for the tower on August 2018. After more than a year of work, the symbolic ceremony of laying the first stone took place on June 17, 2019, in the presence of the architect Jean Nouvel. The inauguration of the tower took place on December 1, 2022.

== Architecture ==
The project involves the complete rehabilitation of the Rose de Cherbourg sector, currently dominated by a motorway interchange, which will be pedestrianised and overlooked by a group of buildings including the Hekla tower. In addition to the Hekla tower, it will include nearly 35,000 m^{2} (380,000 sq ft) of housing, including 10,500 m^{2} (113,000 sq ft) of student accommodation.

Led by the real estate groups AG Real Estate and Hines, the tower overlooks the N13 at the level of the Rose of Cherbourg in Puteaux. It occupies a total of 8,000 m^{2} (86,000 sq ft) of ground area, providing more than 76,000 m^{2} (820,000 sq ft) of offices on 48 floors, including five restaurants and a 250-seat auditorium, on a total of 51 levels. It is able to accommodate 5,800 employees on floors of 1,700 m^{2} (18,000 sq ft) and 3 meters of ceiling height.

Due to its location on the Butte de Chantecoq, it will dominate the skyline of the business district, by 252 meters in relation to the Seine quays of the Esplanade de la Défense compared to 231 meters for the First tower, currently the tallest tower in the district. Of significant environmental quality, the tower has obtained 6 environmental labels, including HQE exceptional and Breeam Excellent. The cost of the project is estimated to be 248 million euros.

== Gallery ==
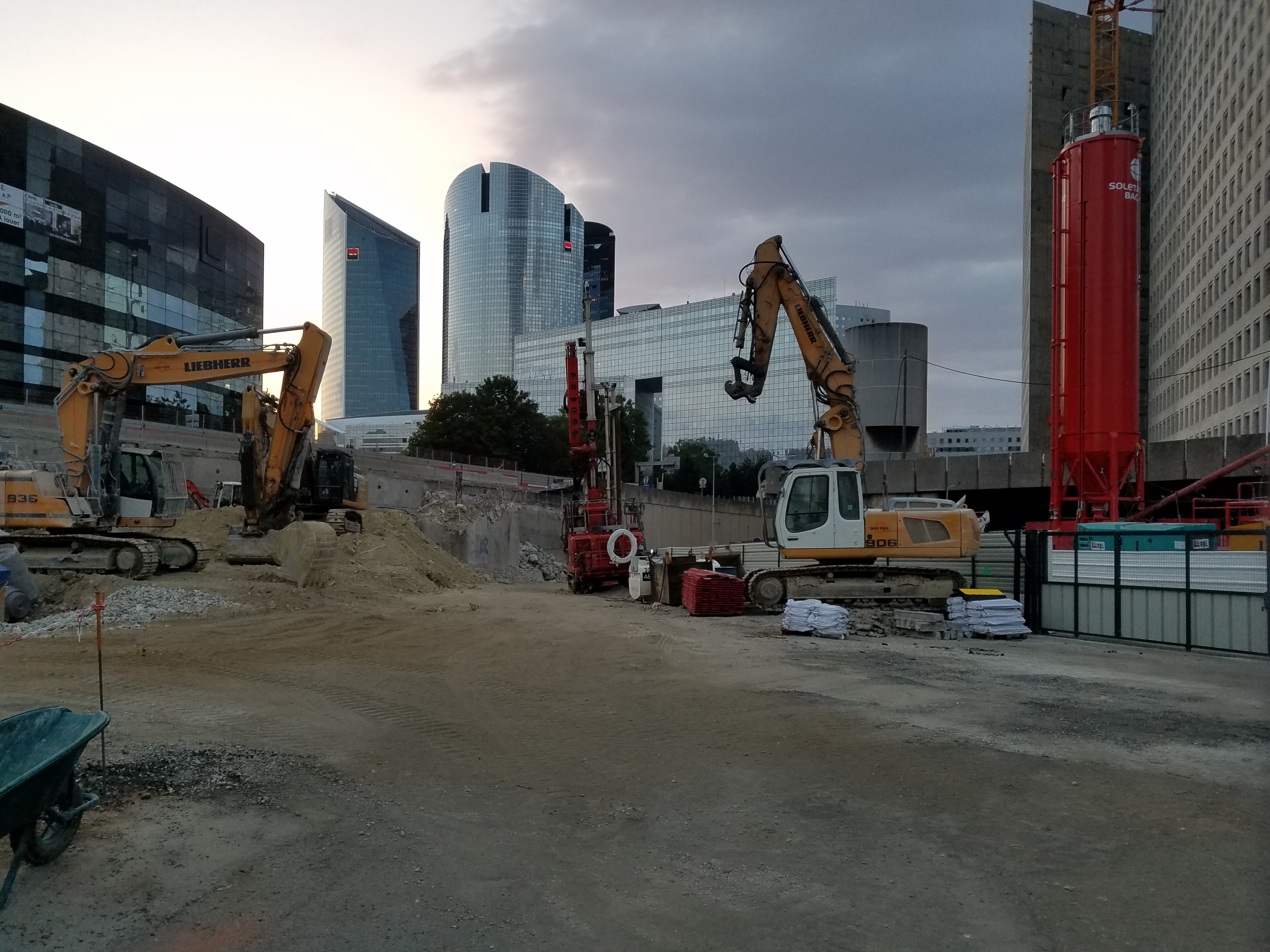
The construction site in July 2018

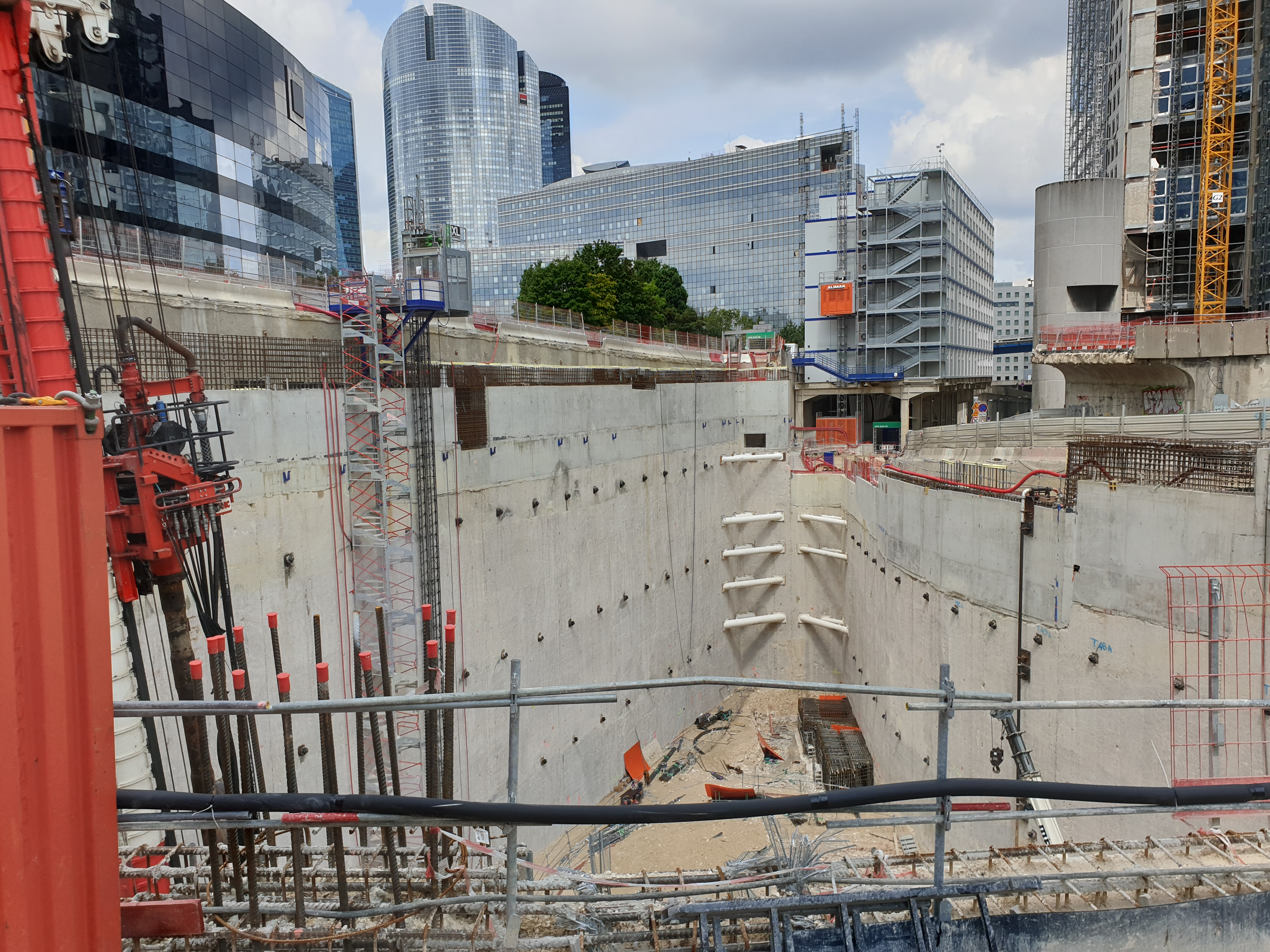
July 2019

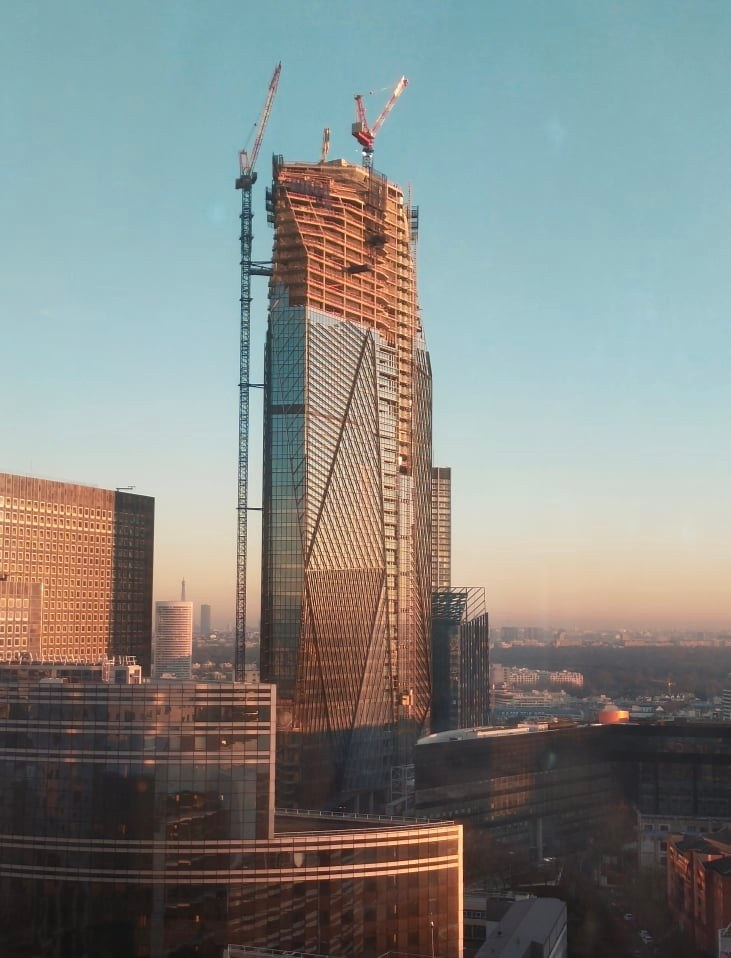
January 2022

January 2023

== See also ==
- La Défense
- List of tallest buildings and structures in the Paris region
- List of tallest buildings in France
