= Bell Laboratories Building =

Building complex in Manhattan, New York

- Bell Telephone Laboratories
- U.S. National Register of Historic Places
- U.S. National Historic Landmark
- New York State Register of Historic Places
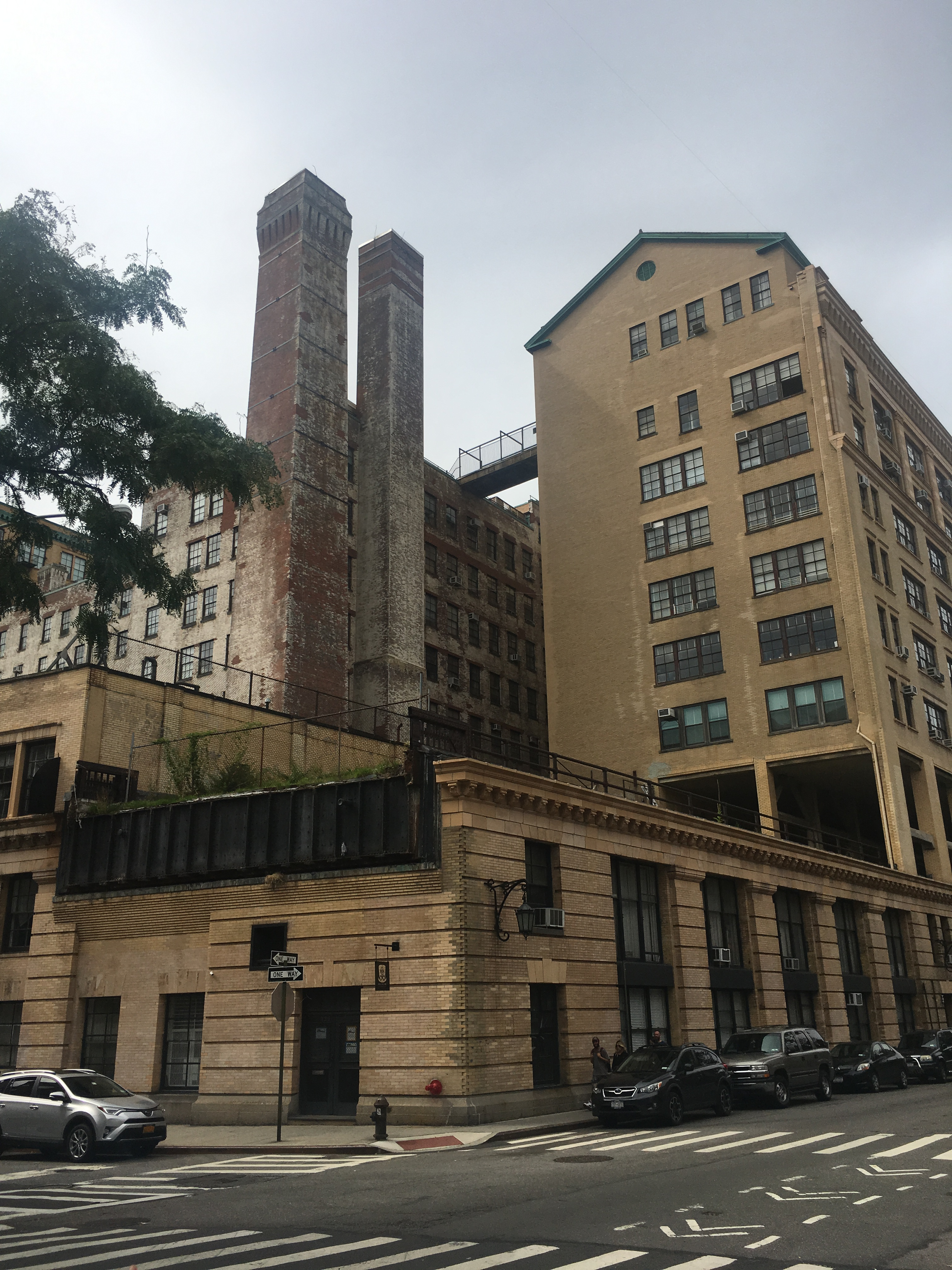
- Location: 463 West Street, Manhattan, New York City, New York
- Coordinates: 40°44′12″N 74°00′35″W
- Built: 1896–1898
- Architects: Cyrus L. W. Eidlitz and others
- NRHP reference No.: 75001202
- NYSRHP No.: 06101.017165, 06101.001676

Significant dates
- Added to NRHP: May 15, 1975
- Designated NHL: May 15, 1975
- Designated NYSRHP: June 23, 1980 (455 West Street only); September 22, 2009 (entire Westbeth complex including 455 West Street)

463 West Street is a 13-building complex located on the block between West Street, Washington Street, Bank Street, and Bethune Street in Manhattan, New York City. It was originally the home of Bell Telephone Laboratories between 1898 and 1966. For a time, it was the largest industrial research center in the United States. It was listed on the National Register of Historic Places and further designated as a National Historic Landmark, as Bell Telephone Laboratories.

Many early technological inventions were developed here including automatic telephone panel and crossbar switches, the first experimental talking movies (1923), black-and-white and color TV, video telephones, radar, the vacuum tube, medical equipment, the development of the phonograph record and the first commercial broadcasts, including the first broadcast of a baseball game and the New York Philharmonic with Arturo Toscanini conducting. It also served as the headquarters for the company from 1925 to the early 1960s, after which the headquarters moved to Murray Hill, New Jersey.

The site was also the home for part of the Manhattan Project during World War II.

After two years of renovations by Richard Meier, the building was reopened in 1970 as Westbeth Artists Community for low- to middle-income artists. In addition to affordable artist housing, the complex contains a theater, an art gallery, and a synagogue.

It was declared a National Historic Landmark in 1975. The complex was listed a second time on the National Register in 2009, for its high-profile and successful example of adaptive reuse of the property.

The southern viaduct section of the West Side Line railroad passed through the building at the second floor. This segment remains in place but is now isolated from the rest of the former railroad viaduct, which is now the High Line elevated park.

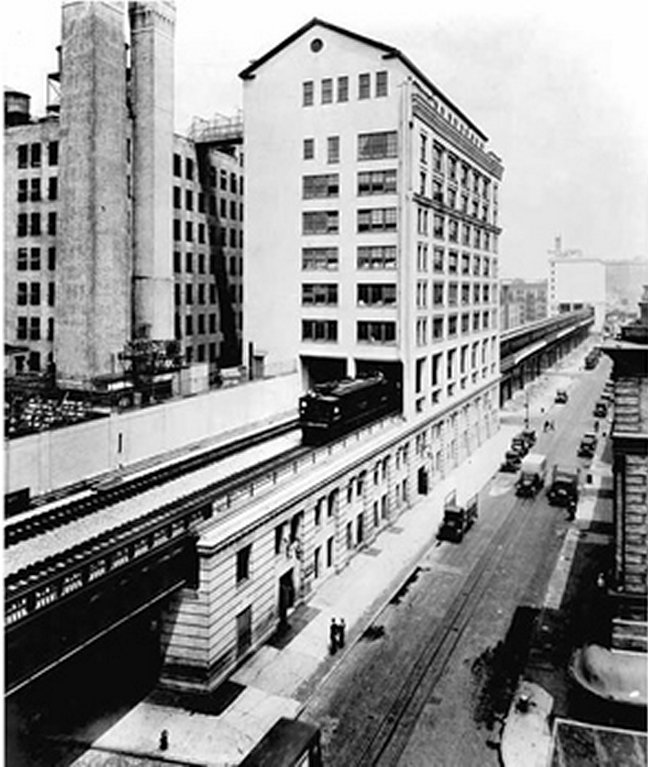
Bell Laboratories Building in 1936

== See also ==
- List of National Historic Landmarks in New York City
- National Register of Historic Places listings in Manhattan below 14th Street
