= Westbeth Artists Community =

Non-profit housing complex for artists in Manhattan, New York

- Westbeth
- U.S. National Register of Historic Places
- U.S. National Historic Landmark
- New York State Register of Historic Places
- New York City Landmark
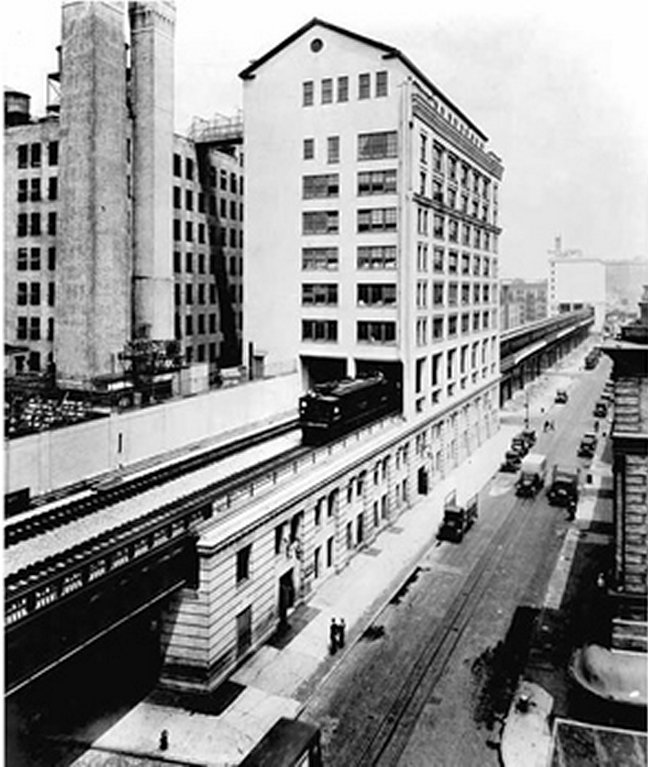
- The Bell Laboratories Building, which now houses Westbeth, seen in 1936
- Coordinates: 40°44′12″N 74°0′31″W
- Area: .9 acres (0.36 ha)
- Part of: Bell Laboratories Building (ID75001202)
- NRHP reference No.: 09001085
- NYSRHP No.: 06101.017165, 06101.001676
- NYCL No.: 2391

Significant dates
- Added to NRHP: December 8, 2009
- Designated NHL: May 15, 1975 (455 West Street only)
- Designated NYSRHP: June 23, 1980 (455 West Street only); September 22, 2009 (entire Westbeth complex including 455 West Street)
- Designated NYCL: October 25, 2011

Westbeth Artists Housing is a nonprofit housing and commercial complex dedicated to providing affordable living and working space for artists and arts organizations in New York City. The complex comprises the full city block bounded by West, Bethune, Washington and Bank Streets in the West Village neighborhood of Manhattan, New York City; the complex is named for the streets West and Bethune.

It occupies the Bell Laboratories Buildings, which were the headquarters of Bell Telephone Laboratories 1898–1966, before being converted in 1968–1970. That conversion was overseen by architect Richard Meier. This low- to moderate-income rental housing and commercial real estate project, the largest in the world of its type, was developed with the assistance of the J.M. Kaplan Fund and federal funds from the National Endowment for the Arts.

Westbeth is owned and operated by Westbeth Corp. Housing Development Fund Corp. Inc., a New York not-for-profit corporation governed by an unpaid, volunteer board of directors. Housing Development Fund Corporations (HDFCs) are a New York City-specific model of cooperative low-equity homeownership. As of 2009, Westbeth had a mostly elderly population, including many original tenants – about 60% of tenants were over the age of 60, and about 30% were over the age of 70. It is thus a naturally occurring retirement community, and has an on-site social worker. Children of tenants are allowed to take over their parents' apartment, and thus there is a multi-generational community. Due to the 10–12-year waiting period for an apartment, Westbeth closed its residential waiting list in 2007. This changed on March 18, 2019, when the institution started accepting applications for an indefinite period of time.

== History ==
Westbeth is among the first examples of adaptive reuse of industrial buildings for artistic and residential use in the United States. It is a complex of 13 buildings in Manhattan's West Village, which was originally part of the Bell Laboratories Building (1898–1966), one of the world's most important industrial research centers. The Bell Labs building was home to many inventions, including the vacuum tube, the condenser microphone, an early version of television, and the transistor. The complex was vacated by Bell Labs in the mid-1960s, and remained empty until later that decade. Using seed money from the J.M. Kaplan Fund and help and encouragement from the National Council for the Arts (which has since become the National Endowment for the Arts), the developer Dixon Bain began renovating the complex into residence-studio spaces for 384 artists of all disciplines. The project was the first significant public commission of Richard Meier. Westbeth opened in 1970.

Artists of all disciplines are admitted as tenants in Westbeth after review by a committee of residential tenants in their discipline. They must also meet certain income requirements. As of 2014, residential tenants paid an average of $800 a month in rent, including electricity, approximately one-third to one-quarter the market rate for comparable space.

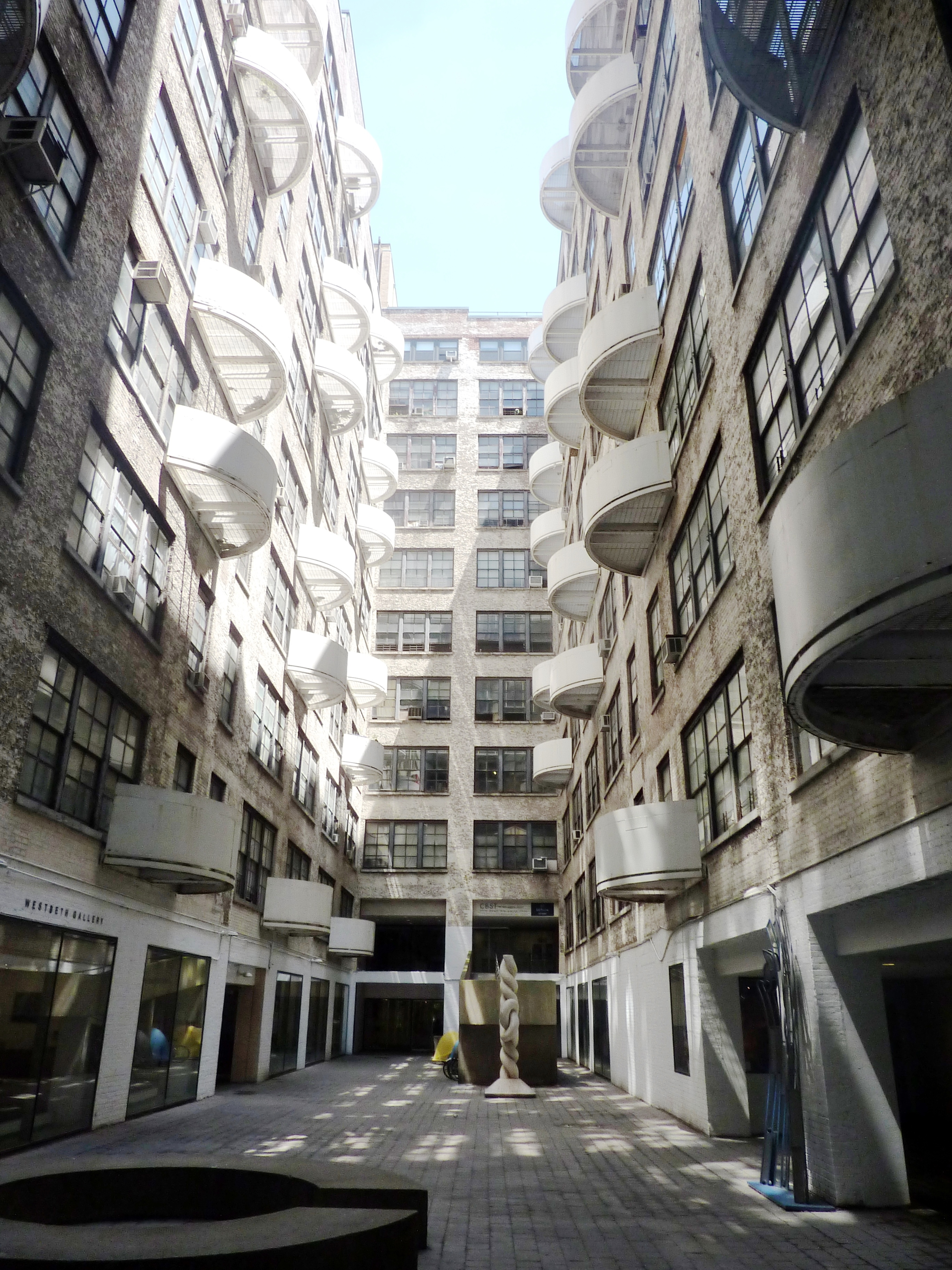
The courtyard of Westbeth (2012)

In addition to its residential component, there are large and small commercial spaces, performance spaces, and rehearsal and artists' studios. Westbeth is home to a number of major cultural organizations, including The New School for Drama, the LAByrinth Theater Company, the Martha Graham Center of Contemporary Dance, and Congregation Beit Simchat Torah, the first LGBT synagogue in New York and the largest in the world, with more than 800 members.

In 1966 Bell Labs moved to Summit, NJ and placed the NYC site up for sale. The space was purchased by the J.M. Kaplan Fund and developed into Westbeth to provide living and studio space for artists. The Bank Street Theatre is an 83-seat venue in the complex. The Westbeth Theatre Center operated out of the complex from 1975 - 2002 until being booted for the New School Acting program (which was willing to pay market rate rents).

The space occupied by The New School was previously occupied by an off-Broadway theatre.

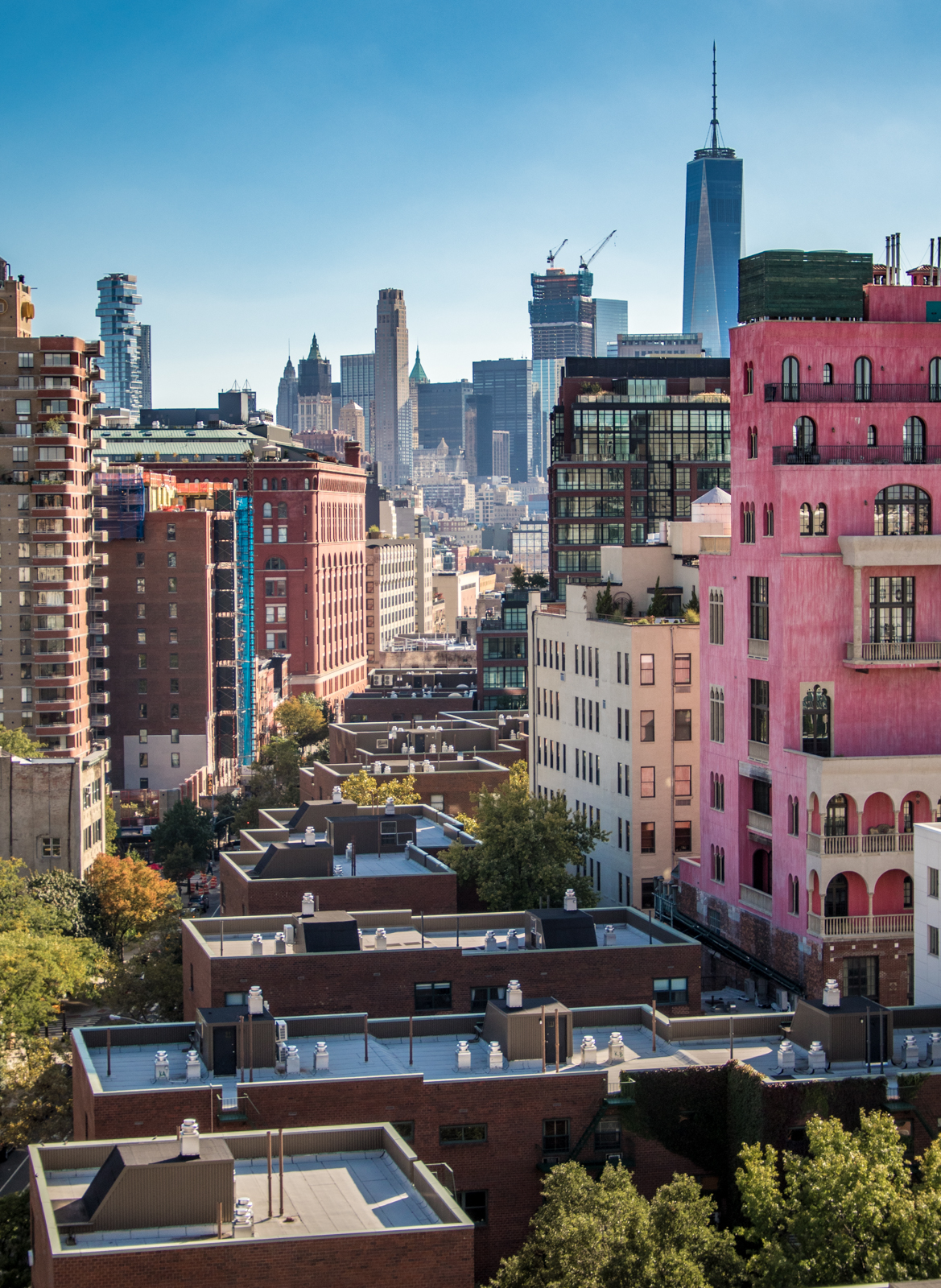
View from the Westbeth Artists Community roof

Westbeth was added to the National Register of Historic Places on December 8, 2009, after the Greenwich Village Society for Historic Preservation (GVSHP), using funds from the J.M. Kaplan Fund, commissioned historic preservationist Andrew Dolkart to write a nominating report to list Westbeth on the State and National Register of Historic Places. The research included interviews with several key figures in the conversion, including architect Richard Meier, choreographer Merce Cunningham, and Joan Davidson, the daughter of J.M. Kaplan who coordinated the founding of Westbeth. The New York State Historic Preservation Board unanimously approved the nomination of Westbeth to the State Register of Historic Places, even though the complex did not meet the general rule that historic sites be at least 50 years old.

As part of an effort to extend landmark protections to the Far West Village, GVSHP campaigned to have the New York City Landmarks Preservation Commission (LPC) designate the entire complex as an individual landmark. In response, the LPC committed to this in 2004 as part of a broader series of area landmark designations it had agreed. In 2009, it took the formal step of scheduling the complex for a hearing and issuing a Statement of Significance. GVSHP urged the LPC to act before the end of 2010, the 40th anniversary of the complex's conversion to artists’ housing. On October 25, 2011, Westbeth was designated a landmark by the LPC.

A community art space opened at Westbeth in 2024. A $84 million renovation of the complex was completed the following February, freeing up 32 apartments.

== Organizations ==
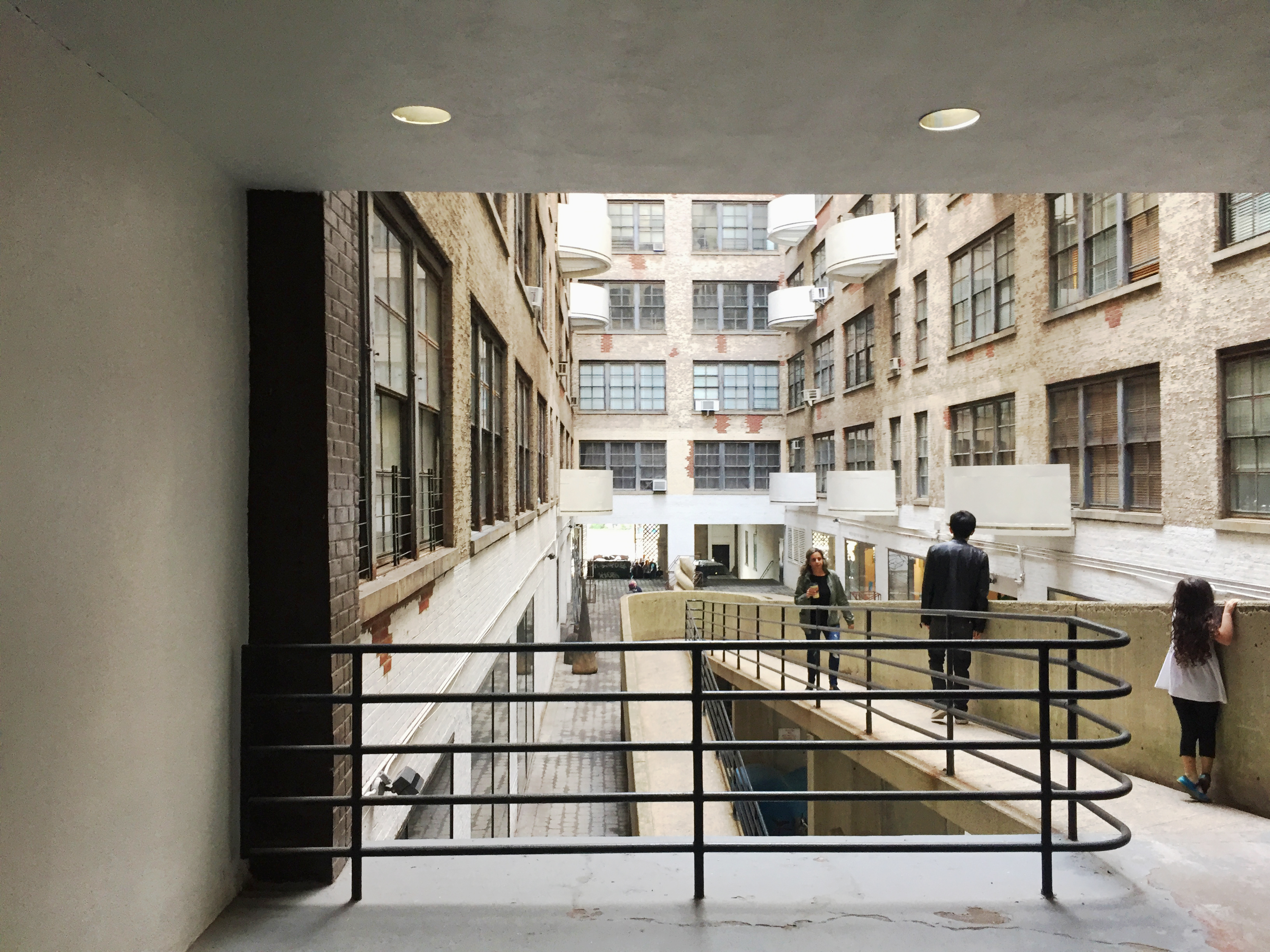
Westbeth, view from ramp

The Westbeth Artists' Residents Council (WARC), elected by the residential tenants, acts as the building's tenants association and provides cultural events to the public such as readings, performances, and film screenings in the Westbeth Community Performance Space and runs the Westbeth Art Gallery, which exhibits the work of both resident and non-resident artists; both in spaces donated by the corporation. The council receives public funding from the NYC Department of Cultural Affairs. In 2008, the council was awarded a major grant from the Pollock-Krasner Foundation for the council's official website. The website hosts individual artists' pages showing the work of its artist-residents and publicizes cultural events and exhibitions sponsored by the council. The council also functions as the tenants association, and is involved in various larger community issues, particularly with regard to preserving the historic character of the West Village neighborhood, and zoning issues.

The Westbeth Beautification Committee is a subcommittee of the Westbeth Artists Residents Council and a Westbeth tenant volunteer organization. The committee has held an annual Westbeth Flea Market since 1984. The flea market is dedicated to fundraising for projects that benefit Westbeth, the neighborhood community, local charities and disaster relief.

== Notable people ==
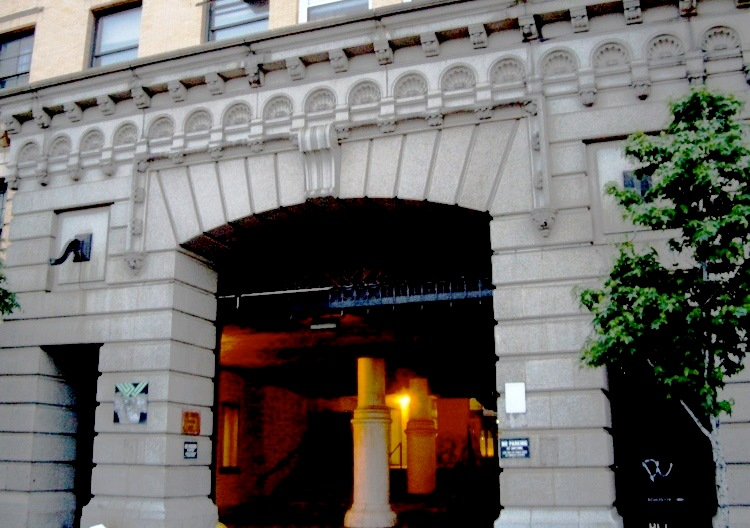
A gate on West Street (2007)

Westbeth Artists Housing has been home to a number of influential artists, musicians and performers including Diane Arbus – whose suicide in 1971 caused a stir in the young community – Robert Beauchamp, Barton Lidice Benes, Paul Benjamin, Karl Bissinger, Barnaby Ruhe, Black-Eyed Susan, Joseph Chaikin, David Del Tredici, Robert De Niro Sr., Vin Diesel, John Dobbs, Gil Evans, David Greenspan, Moses Gunn, director Tod Culpan Williams and his sister, former supermodel Rachel Williams, Hans Haacke, Billy Harper, Spencer Holst, Irv Teibel, Gayle Kirschenbaum, Anita Kushner, Ralph Lee, Hal Miller, Herman Rose, Barbara Rosenthal, Muriel Rukeyser, Ed Sanders, Tobias Schneebaum, Anne Tabachnick and Jean Zaleski.

Merce Cunningham, the choreographer and dancer, had his studio and offices at Westbeth for more than 40 years, from 1971 up to the time of his death and the dissolution of the Merce Cunningham Dance Company in 2012.

Edward Field and his partner Neil Derrick, co-authors of The Villagers, lived together at Westbeth. As of February 2018, Field continued to live at Westbeth and was considered one of its icons.

Jean-Marie Haessle and his ex-wife Lucienne Weinberger were among the first residents of Westbeth.

One of the first feminist theater groups in the country, the Westbeth Playwrights Feminist Collective, originated here.

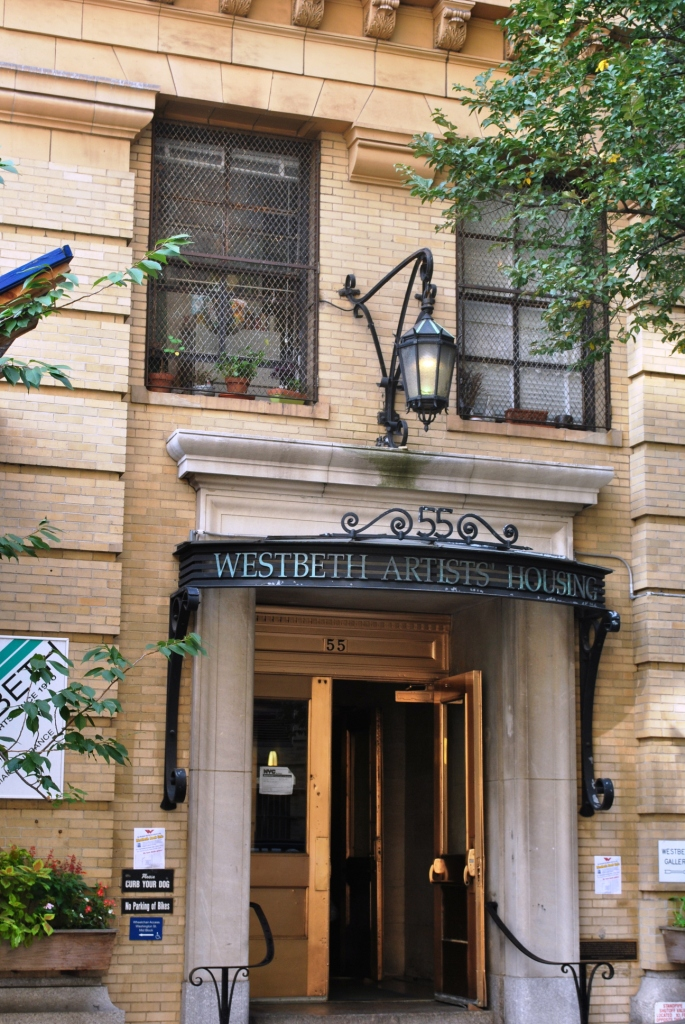
Entrance on Bethune

The film Growing Up At Westbeth by Christina Maile and Francia Tobacman Smith features archival photos, footage and interviews, 40 years later, with the children who grew up at Westbeth. The film was shown at the 40th Anniversary Celebration of Westbeth in October 2010 as part of the Westbeth Film Festival. A film about the noted feminist artist Anita Steckel, a resident of Westbeth, is in production by the same filmmakers. "Harry's Gift, A New York Story," is a 2015 documentary by Alexandra M. Isles about Harry Schunk, a photographer and long-time Westbeth tenant, and the man who cleaned out his apartment after his death.

The feature documentary Winter at Westbeth by Rohan Spong charts one year (2014–2015) in the life of the building and spotlights three long-term residents: filmmaker Edith Stephen, poet Ilsa Gilbert and notable contemporary dancer Dudley Williams of Martha Graham and Alvin Ailey fame. It had its world premiere in 2016 at the 60th Sydney Film Festival. The film then had its international premiere at IFC Center, where it screened in competition as part of Doc NYC, ultimately receiving a Special Jury Mention. It has since screened at the US Library of Congress.

Notable current and past artists-in-residence include:

- Peter Bernstein – jazz guitarist
- Miriam Chaikin, writer
- Edward Field – poet
- Valerie Ghent – musician, singer, songwriter, producer
- David Greenspan – actor, playwright, director
- Madeleine Yayodele Nelson – musician
- Hugh Seidman – poet
- Jelon Vieira – artistic director
- Nasheet Waits – drummer

== See also ==
- List of National Historic Landmarks in New York City
- List of New York City Designated Landmarks in Manhattan below 14th Street
- National Register of Historic Places listings in Manhattan below 14th Street
- Paul Abels
