= Bank Street (Manhattan) =

Street in Manhattan, New York

Coordinates: 40°44′11.6″N 74°0′20.28″W

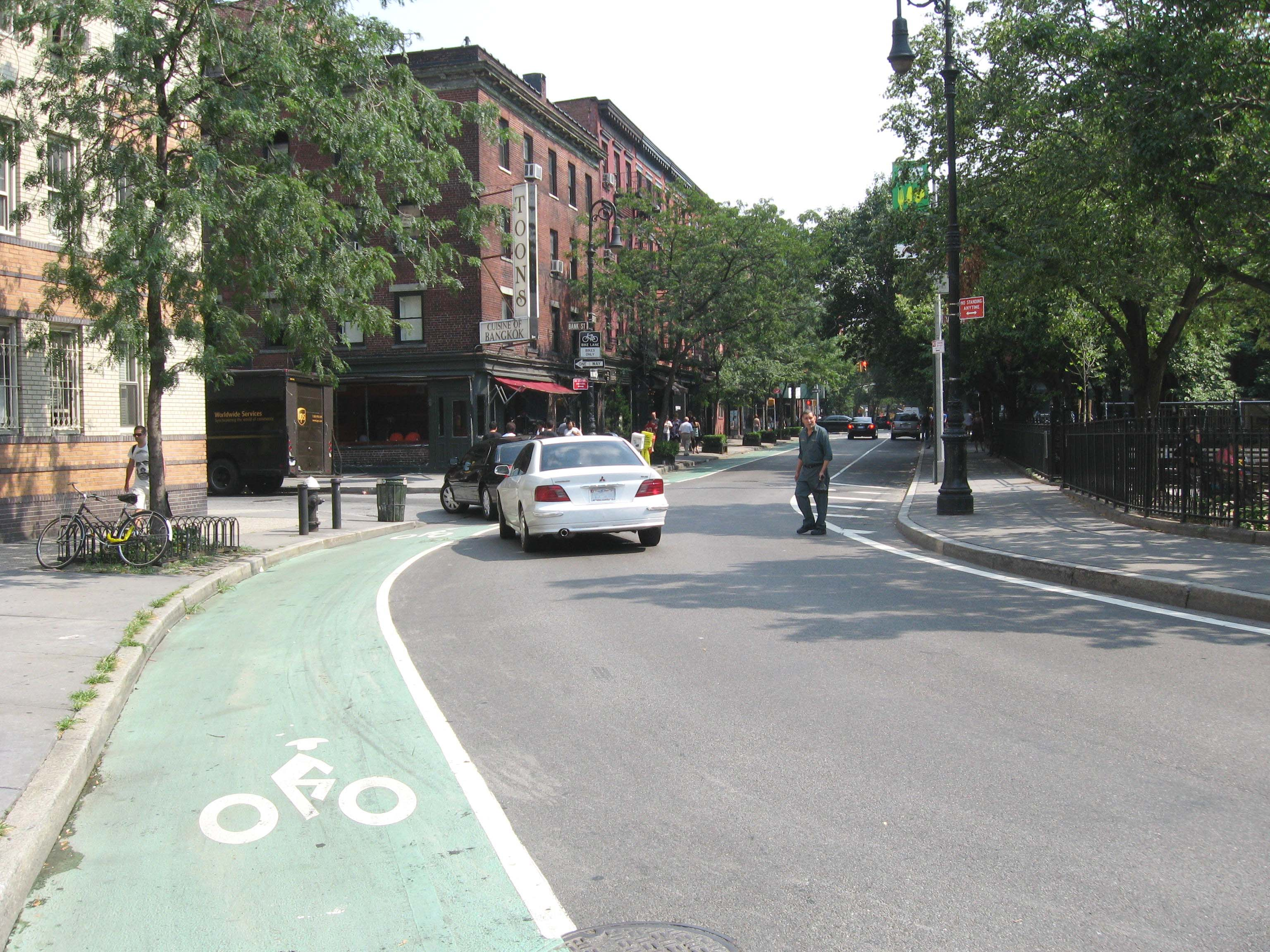
Turning from Bleecker to Bank Street

Bank Street is a primarily residential street in the West Village part of Greenwich Village in the borough of Manhattan in New York City. It runs for a total length of about 725 metres (2,379 ft) from West Street, crossing Washington Street and Greenwich Street, to Hudson Street and Bleecker Street where it is interrupted by the Bleecker Playground, north of which is Abingdon Square; it then continues to Greenwich Avenue, crossing West 4th Street and Waverly Place. Vehicular traffic runs west-east along this one-way street. As with several other east-west streets in the Far West Village, the three blocks west of Hudson Street are paved with setts.

Bank Street is named for the Bank of New York, which bought eight lots on the street in 1798 and established a branch there. A clerk in the bank's main office on Wall Street had contracted yellow fever, leading the bank to buy land in Greenwich Village in order to have a branch office away from Wall Street where it could conduct business in the event of future emergencies.

== Historical locations and notable residents ==
The Bank Street College of Education, which was founded in 1916 as the Bureau of Educational Experiments, was located on Bank Street from 1930 to 1970. It retains the name but is no longer located there.

Grace Jones once lived at no. 166.

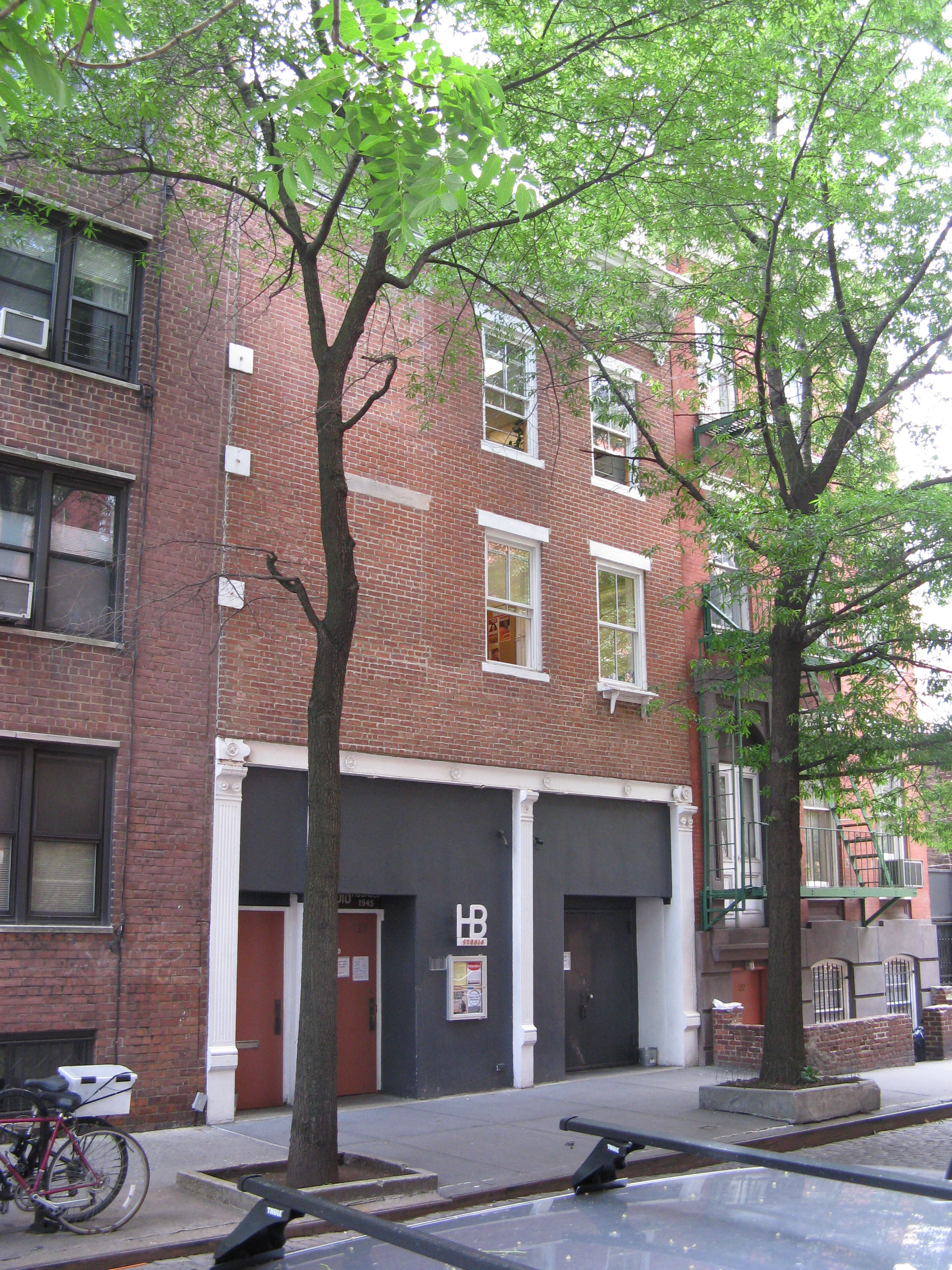
The HB Studio

The former Bell Laboratories headquarters, now a National Historic Landmark, occupied the Westbeth complex at no. 155 on the north side of Bank Street. That complex now houses the Westbeth Artists Community where a large number of notable artists have been in residence. It also provides several performance spaces.

The HB Studio, an acting studio founded in 1945 by Herbert Berghof and his wife Uta Hagen, is located at no. 120. Many notable actors have taught and studied there. Opposite, Pearl Bailey lived in no. 109 in 1968.

On October 16, 1971, the musicians John Lennon and Yoko Ono moved into apartment No. 105. Originally owned by Joe Butler, the former drummer of the band the Lovin' Spoonful, the apartment featured two large rooms, one of which the couple bought and the other they rented. The couple's neighbors included John Cage, Bob Dylan, Jerry Rubin and Merce Cunningham, whose phone they would use to avoid FBI wiretapping. In April 1973, Lennon and Ono moved to The Dakota building, located on the upper West Side of New York.

The 17-year-old Betty Bacall, soon to be known as Lauren Bacall, moved into no. 75.

Marion Tanner, inspiration for the book, play, and musical Auntie Mame lived at 72.

On February 2, 1979, Sid Vicious died of a drug overdose in no. 63.

The journalist Charles Kuralt lived downstairs at no. 34 which was built in 1844 in the Gothic Revival style. The upstairs apartment of that house was described in Martin Amis' 1984 novel Money and Christopher Hitchens was a house guest there for six months when he arrived in New York from England. Mark Knopfler bought the neighbouring no. 36 in the late 1980s. The restaurant The Waverly Inn at no. 16 was bought in 2006 by Graydon Carter who moved in at no. 22.

The writer John Dos Passos lived at no. 11 in 1924–25 when he worked on his novel Manhattan Transfer. His publisher, James Laughlin, lived next door at no. 9. Writer Willa Cather lived at no. 5 from 1913 until 1927 when that building was demolished during the construction of extensions to the IRT Broadway–Seventh Avenue Line; it became then nos. 1–7 where Patricia Highsmith lived with her family in 1938–39.
