= List of Delta Phi members =

Delta Phi is an American college fraternity formed on November 17, 1827, at Union College in Schenectady, New York. Following are some of the notable members of the fraternity.

== Academia ==
- Howard Crosby - Γ - preacher; chancellor of New York University
- Harvey N. Davis - Β - president of Stevens Institute of Technology
- William Henry Steele Demarest - Ε - Dutch Reformed minister and president of Rutgers College (now Rutgers University)
- Livingston W. Houston - Λ - president of Rensselaer Polytechnic Institute
- George Low - Λ - NASA administrator and 14th President of Rensselaer Polytechnic Institute
- John B. Whitehead - Ξ - electrical engineer and a professor and dean of the School of Engineering at Johns Hopkins University

== Art and architecture ==
- Art Gensler - Π - architect who formed Gensler

== Business ==
- John J. Albright - Λ - businessman and philanthropist
- John Jacob Astor IV - Ζ - industrialist and philanthropist
- Edgar Bronfman Sr. - Υ - president, treasurer and CEO of Seagram
- Marvin Bush - Ρ - businessman and George W. Bush's younger brother
- William P. Carey - H - founder of W. P. Carey & Co.; donated funds to establish the Carey Business School at Johns Hopkins University, the University of Maryland Francis King Carey School of Law, and the W. P. Carey School of Business at Arizona State University
- Haley Fiske - Ε - lawyer and president of the Metropolitan Life Insurance Company
- Christopher Galvin - Ρ - chairman and CEO of Motorola; co-founder of Harrison Street Real Estate Capital
- Raymond E. Joslin - Σ - businessman and cable executive
- Halsey Minor - Ρ - co-founder and former CEO of CNET Inc.
- John Pierpont Morgan Jr. - Ζ - financier; founder of J, P, Morgan Bank and Morgan Stanley
- Wylie F. L. Tuttle - Δ - real estate developer responsible for the construction of the Tour Montparnasse in Paris

== Entertainment ==
- George Macready - Β - actor
- Paolo Montalban - E - actor of stage and screen
- Richard Tuggle - Ρ - screenwrite and director

== Law ==
- Stanley Forman Reed - Ρ - Associate Justice of the Supreme Court of the United States

== Literature and journalism ==
- Russell Baker - Ξ - Pulitzer Prize–winning writer; former host of PBS show Masterpiece Theatre
- Sullivan Ballou - Β - author of famous Civil War love letter at the First Battle of Bull Run
- John Dickerson - Ρ - journalist and contributing writer with The Atlantic
- Edgar Fawcett - Δ - novelist and poet
- John Wesley Harper - Δ - co-founder of Harper & Brothers publishing group
- Joseph Abner Harper - Δ - co-founder of Harper & Brothers publishing group
- Allan Nevins - Τ - two-time winner of the Pulitzer Prize for History, professor of history at Columbia University
- George Santayana - Z - author and philosopher famous for noting that "those who cannot remember the past, are condemned to repeat it"
- Charles Scribner I - Θ - founder of Charles Scribner's Sons publishing group
- George Will - Σ - Pulitzer Prize-winning conservative newspaper columnist, journalist, and author

== Military ==
- Thomas Ridgway - Γ -career officer in the United States Army and father of General Matthew Ridgway

== Politics ==
- Thomas B. Evans Jr. - P - United States House of Representatives
- William Gaston - Γ - Governor of Massachusetts, Mayor of Boston, Massachusetts State Senate, and Massachusetts House of Representatives
- Garret A. Hobart - E - Vice President of the United States under William McKinley
- Jay Jones - ΩΑ - Virginia House of Delegates
- George C. Ludlow - E - Governor of New Jersey
- Thomas W. Miller - Ο - United States House of Representatives
- Philip S. Post - Α - United States House of Representatives and diplomat
- Albert Ritchie - Ξ - Governor of Maryland and Attorney General of Maryland
- James Roosevelt - Ζ - United States House of Representatives; Secretary to the President; son of Franklin D. Roosevelt
- George H. Sharpe - E - New York State Assembly, Secret Service officer, and diplomat
- Allen Wright - Α - Principal Chief of the Choctaw Republic

== Religion ==
- John C. Bauerschmidt - Φ - Bishop of Middle Tennessee
- James Petigru Boyce - Β - pastor, theologian, and a principle founder of the Southern Baptist Theological Seminary
- Henry Y. Satterlee - Δ - first Episcopal Bishop of Washington, founder of the Washington National Cathedral
- Edmund Sears - Α - Unitarian minister and author who wrote the lyrics to "It Came Upon the Midnight Clear"

== Science, engineering, and medicine ==
- John Bogart - Ε - civil engineer, New York State Engineer and Surveyor
- Edgar Cortright - Λ - director of NASA's Langley Research Center
- William H. Nichols - Γ - chemist and businessman
- John Whitridge Williams - Ξ - pioneering obstetrician at Johns Hopkins Hospital

== Sports ==
- Larry Brown - Η - Olympic runner
- Ned Rice - ΩΑ - General Manager of the Philadelphia Phillies
- Curtis Stevens - Λ - bobsledder who won the gold medal in the two-man event at the 1932 Winter Olympics in Lake Placid
- Wallace Wade - Β - head football coach at the University of Alabama and Duke University
- Finn Wentworth - N - COO and owner of New York Yankees; founder of YES Network
