= Tours Duo =

Two skyscrapers under construction, located in the 13th arrondissement of Paris

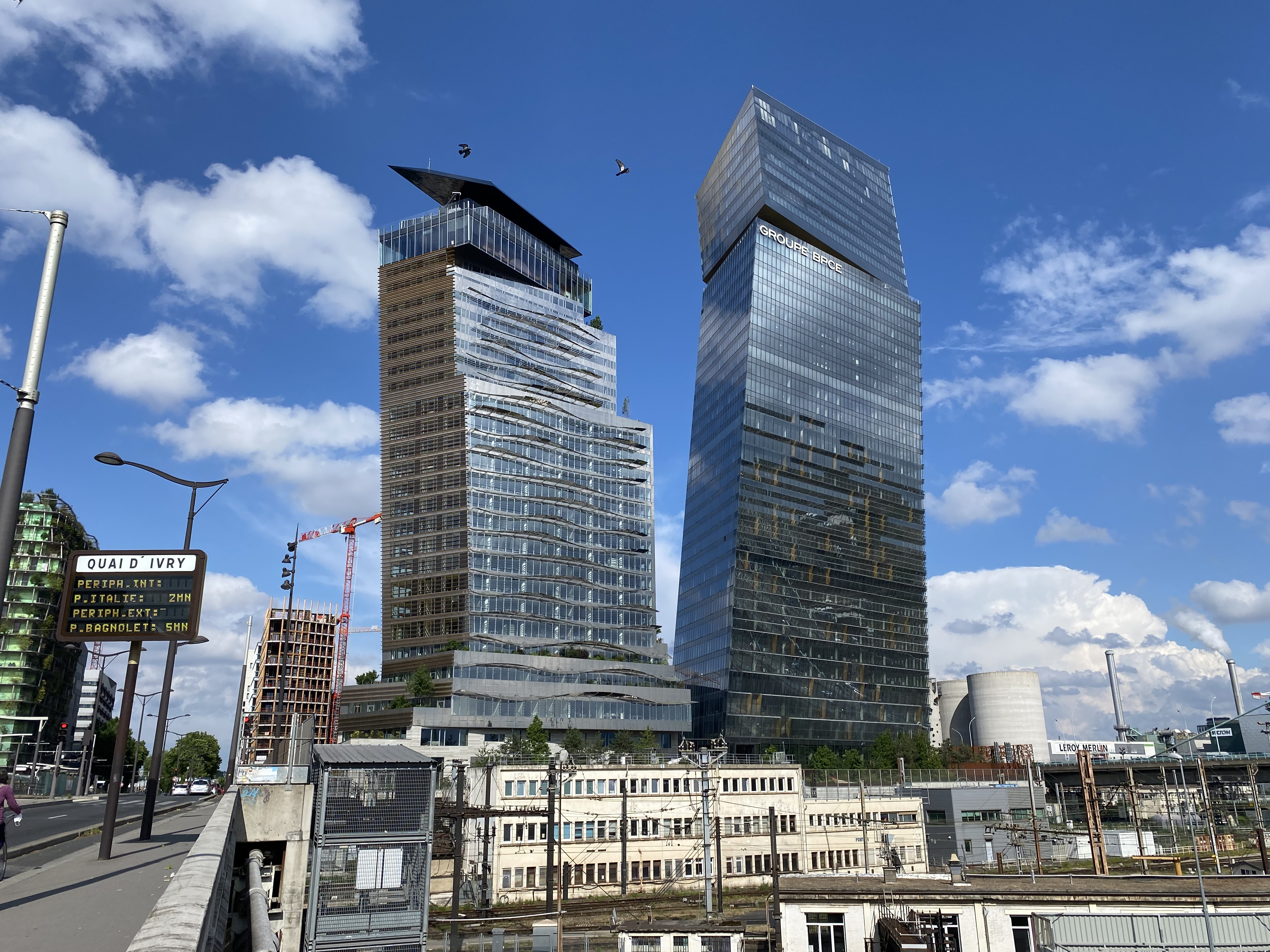

General information
- Status: Completed
- Type: Hôtel, office, stores
- Architectural style: Modernism
- Location: 51 Rue Bruneseau; 13th arrondissement of Paris, France
- Coordinates: 48.8248543°N 2.3828466719522536°E
- Construction started: 2017
- Completed: 2021
- Owner: Ivanhoé Cambridge

Height
- Roof: 180 m (590 ft)

Technical details
- Floor count: 39
- Floor area: 108,000 m^{2} (1,160,000 sq ft)

Design and construction
- Architect: Jean Nouvel

Website
- www.jeannouvel.com/en/projects/tours-duo/

Tours Duo are two skyscrapers designed by Jean Nouvel and located in the 13th arrondissement of Paris, on the edge of the Boulevard Périphérique and Ivry-sur-Seine. As of 2022, most of their surface was occupied by the group headquarters of banking group BPCE.

The mixed-use project covers more than 108,000 m2. It mainly houses offices but also a hotel, a restaurant, a bar with a panoramic terrace overlooking Paris, an auditorium, shops and green terraces. The Tour Duo n°1, with 180 m, is the third tallest building in Paris after the Eiffel Tower (324 m) and the Tour Montparnasse (209 m), at par with the forthcoming Tour Triangle. The whole is intended to complete the "belt" formed by several towers and high-rise buildings at the gates of Paris.

Work began at the end of March 2017, and the two completed towers were delivered in 2021.

== Gallery ==
Tours Duo under construction

Tours Duo under construction in twilight

Tours Duo in 2021

== See also ==
- List of tallest buildings and structures in the Paris region
- List of tallest buildings in France
