= Tour Majunga =

Skyscraper located La Défense, near Paris

- Tour Majunga, 2024
- Interactive map of the Tour Majunga area

General information
- Status: Completed
- Type: Office
- Location: La Défense, Puteaux, IDF, France
- Coordinates: 48.8888°N 2.2435°E
- Construction started: January 2011; 15 years ago
- Completed: July 2014; 11 years ago
- Opening: 2014
- Owner: Amundi Immobilier; Mirae Asset Financial Group

Height
- Roof: 194 m (636 ft)

Technical details
- Floor count: 47
- Floor area: 69,500 m^{2} (748,000 sq ft)

Design and construction
- Architect: Jean-Paul Viguier
- Developer: Unibail-Rodamco-Westfield
- Engineer: Eiffage Construction
- Main contractor: Kyotec Group

Website
- Official website

The Tour Majunga is an office skyscraper located in La Défense district of Paris, France. Built between 2011 and 2014, the tower stands at 194 m (636 ft) tall (top of its spire) with 47 floors and is the current sixth tallest building in France after Tour First, Tour Montparnasse and Tour Incity when it was completed.

== History ==
The architect of the tower is Jean-Paul Viguier. Its developer and promoter is Unibail-Rodamco. The tower was inaugurated on September 25, 2014. Unibail-Rodamco has signed a first long-term lease with Axa Investment Managers for the first eighteen lower levels of the tower. Deloitte occupies floors 21 to 39 of the tower.

The land on which the Majunga tower stands was acquired by the Unibail-Rodamco group in July 2006, on the southern esplanade of La Défense.

The construction of the Majunga tower managed by Eiffage Construction, began at the end of January 2011 and was completed in July 2014. The cost of construction amounted to 850 million euros.

The tower is directly connected to the Esplanade de La Défense station by a 14-meter high entrance hall. Its two elevator banks serve the thirty-nine floors of suprastructure offices. The surface area of each floor varies between 1,350 m^{2} (14,500 sq ft) and 1,550 m^{2} (16,700 sq ft) SUBL, for a total surface area of 67,200 m^{2} (723,000 sq ft) SUBL (inter-company restaurant included).

On July 3, 2019, Amundi Immobilier announces the acquisition, on behalf of funds it manages, of the Majunga tower alongside a consortium of investors led by Mirae Asset Daewoo, for a price of 850 million euros.

On March 3, 2019, Korean Investors reported that South Korean investment banking company, Mirae Asset Daewoo Co. Ltd., and French asset manager Amundi have won the bid for the building at about US$960 million. On 5 July that year, Parisian publication Defense-92 reported that both companies had completed the building acquisition process.

== Architecture ==
The architecture of the tower was created by the French firm Jean-Paul Viguier et Associés, architecture and urban planning and was designed to recreate a link between the Esplanade de la Défense and the commune of Puteaux.

The Majunga Tower is a "break with the monolithic architecture" of older generation towers. The building appears as three adjoining planes, each unfolding in its own way but forming a whole. The facades are cut out in such a way as to house upper-floor gardens which will play a role in thermal regulation and break the monotony of the levels. One of the tower's facades is beveled with a wave-like movement.

The Majunga Tower is a recipient of the BREEAM “Excellent” and Haute Qualité Environnementale (HQE) “Excellent” certifications. It is also BBC certified. In 2011, it obtained the Sustainable Building Passport from Certivéa, a subsidiary of CSTB.

Majunga is the first tower in France to feature a loggia or balcony providing outdoor access on every floor. The tower is also equipped with openings allowing access to the open air in each office. In addition, the high ceilings and bioclimatic facades adapted to the tower's orientation maximize the penetration of natural light. Daylight is perceptible in all spaces.

=== Interior design ===
Majunga's interior design and decor were created by Saguez Workstyle, a consultancy specializing in office architecture and workplace design. Saguez brought a fresh perspective to the real estate market by combining workspaces and the art of living. Majunga's design was conceived to facilitate movement and meetings between employees thanks to redesigned spaces.

== Gallery ==
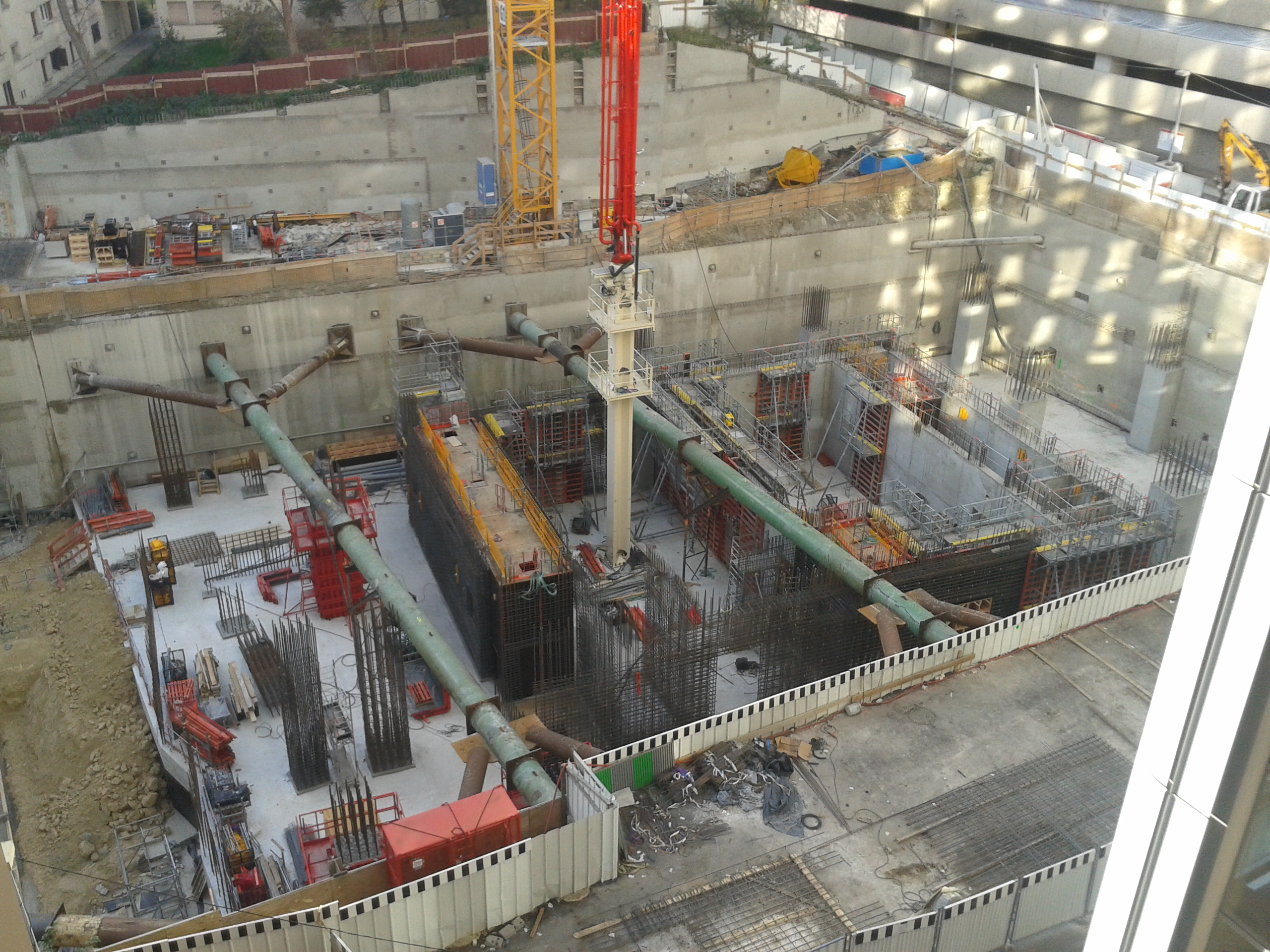
Construction of the tower began in November 2011

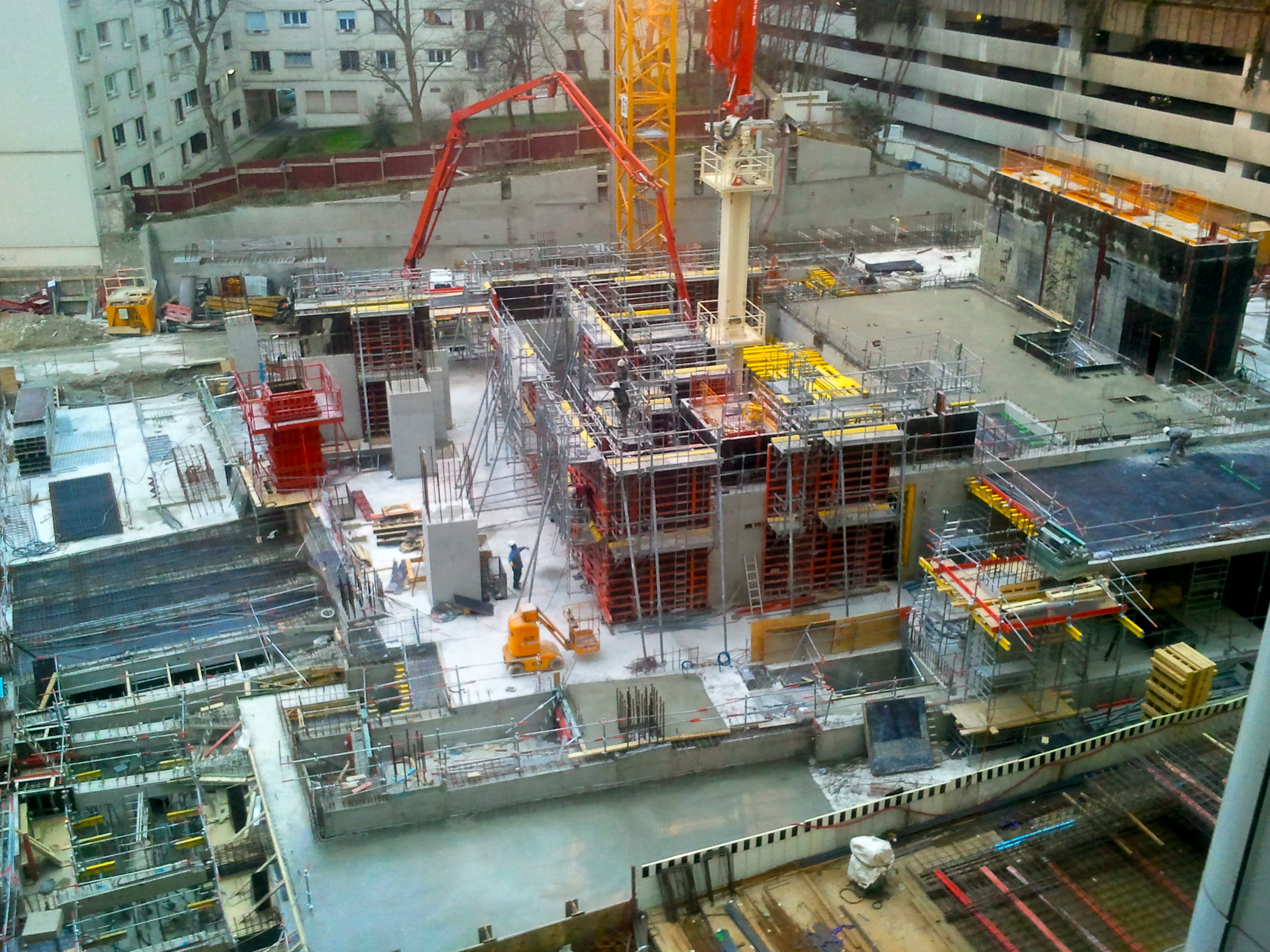
March 2012

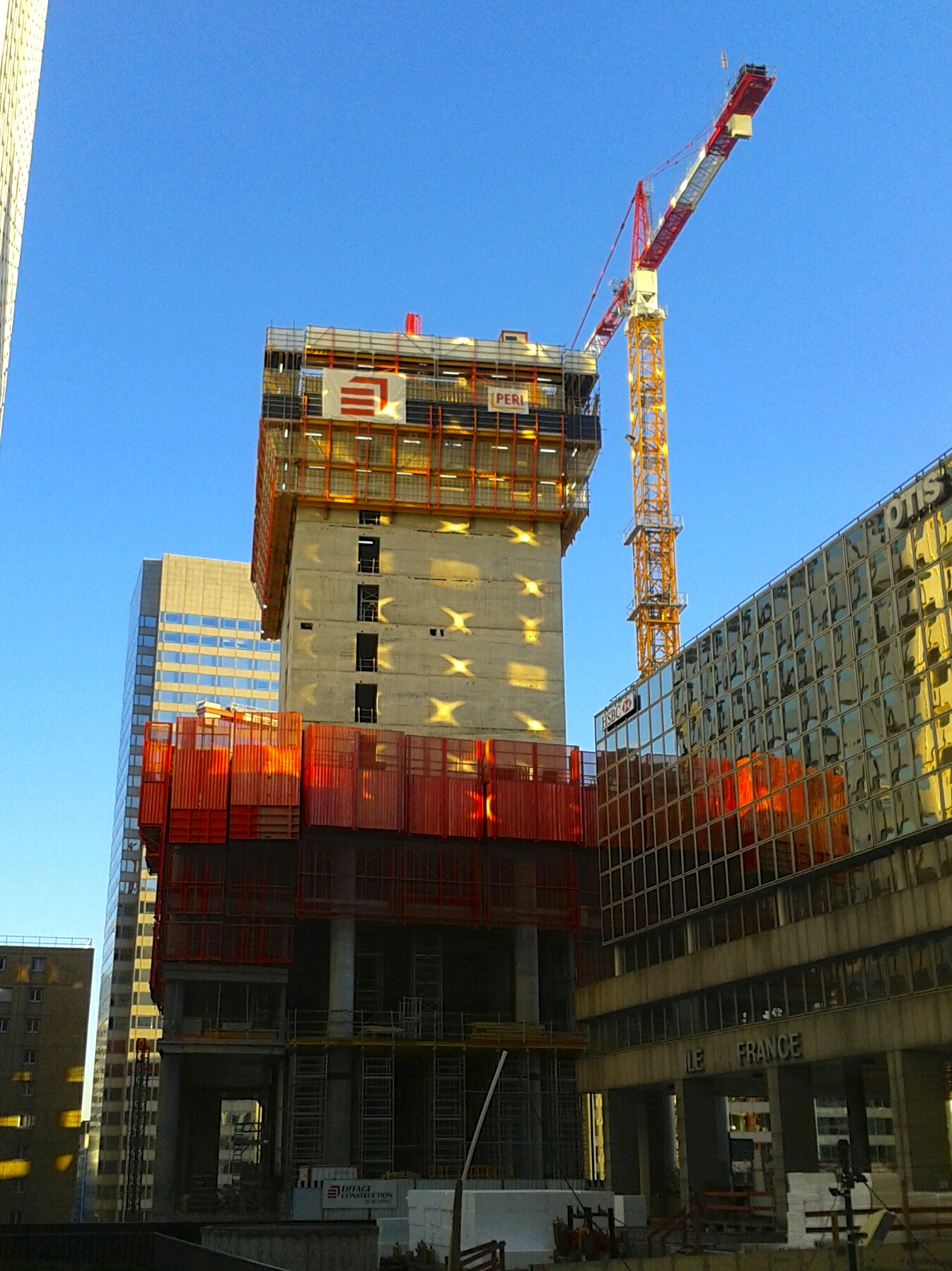
December 2012

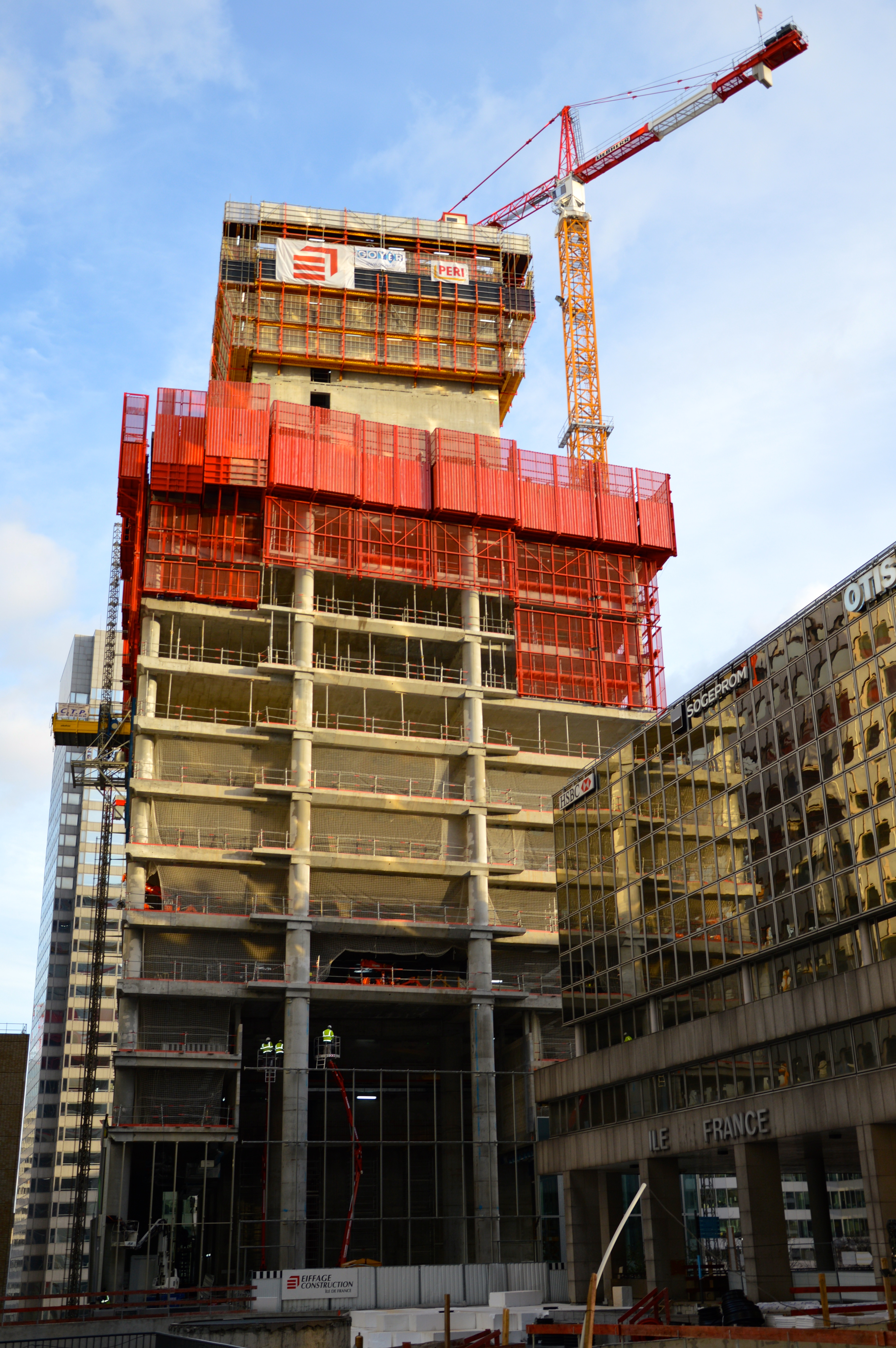
February 2013

== See also ==
- List of tallest buildings and structures in the Paris region
- List of tallest buildings in France
- Mirae Asset Daewoo set to acquire Tour Majunga
