= List of tallest buildings in France =

For non-building structures like towers, masts and chimneys, see List of tallest structures in France. This list does not include the Eiffel Tower, which is considered a tower, not a building.

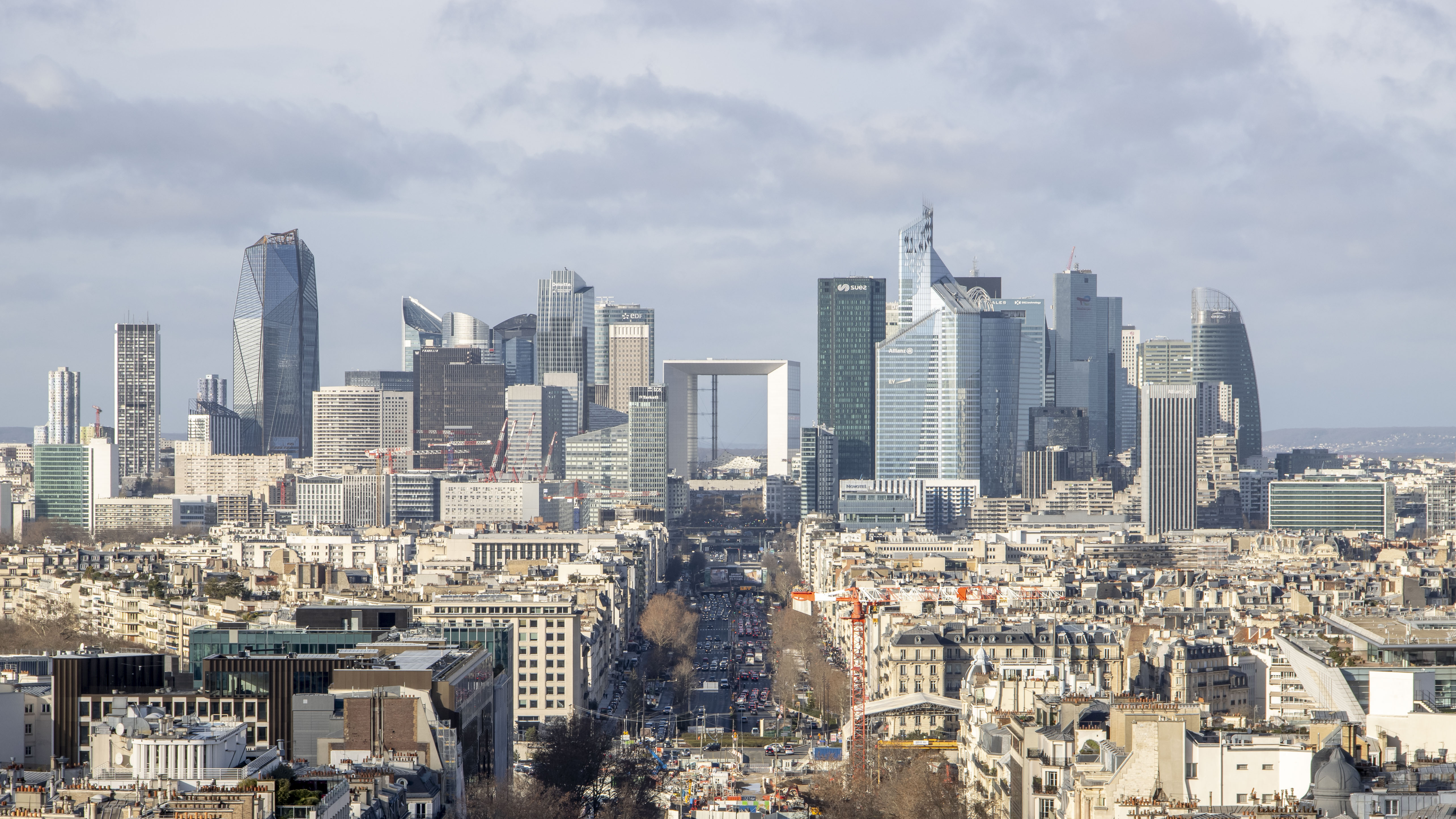
Paris, with the skyscrapers of La Défense in the background

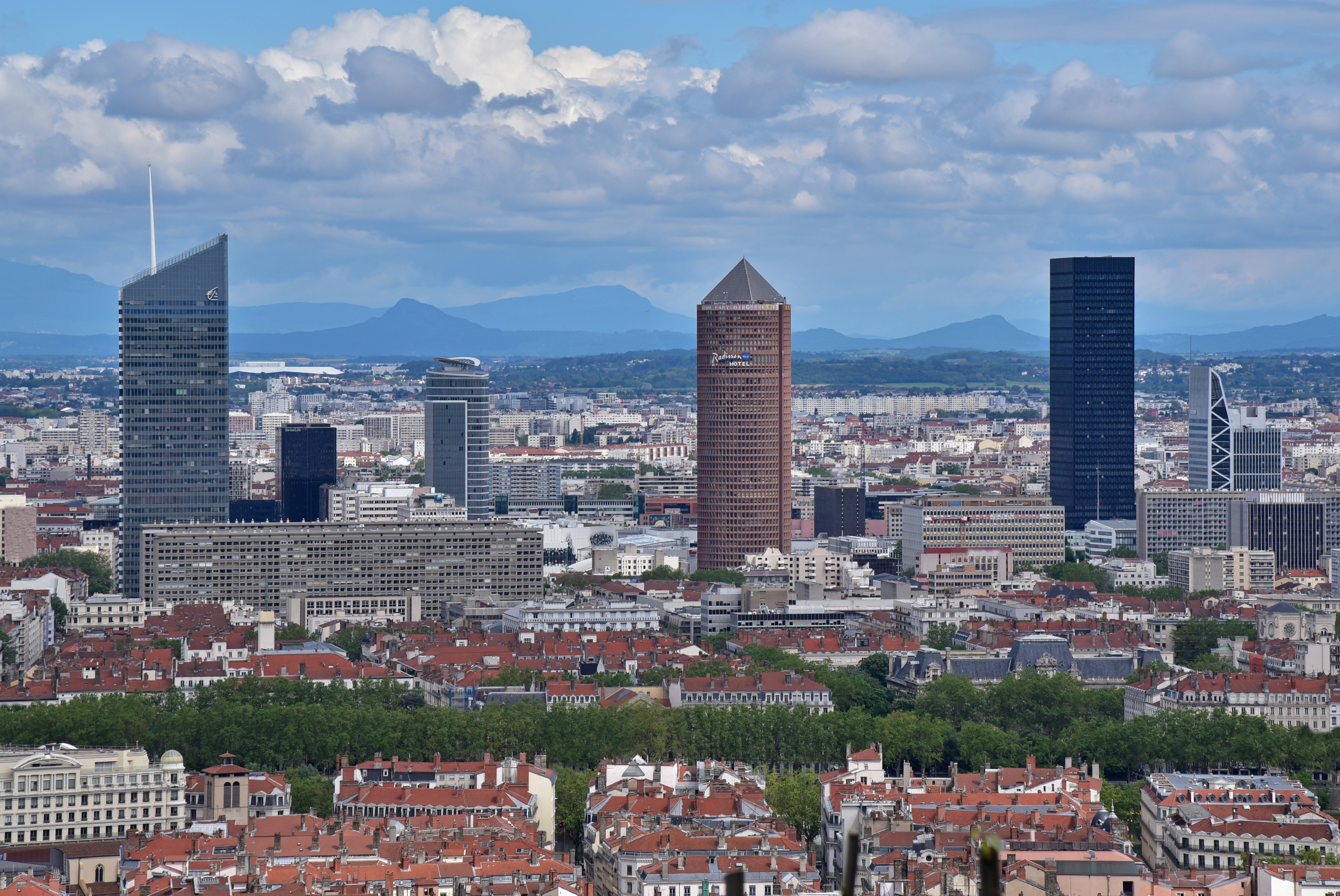
Lyon with the skyscrapers of La Part-Dieu

Marseille with the skyscrapers of Euroméditerranée

== Tallest buildings ==
Was the tallest building in France upon completion

| Rank | Name | Image | City | Height metres / feet | Floors | Year | Notes |
|---|---|---|---|---|---|---|---|
| 1 | The Link | | Paris (La Defense) | 242 metres (794 ft) | 52 | 2025 | Tallest building in France since 2025 |
| 2 | Tour First | | Paris (La Defense) | 231 metres (758 ft) | 52 | 2011 | Tallest building in France from 2011 until 2025 |
| 3 | Tour Hekla | | Paris (La Defense) | 220 metres (720 ft) | 49 | 2022 | |
| 4 | Tour Montparnasse | | Paris | 210 metres (690 ft) | 59 | 1972 | Tallest building in France from 1972 until 2011 |
| 5 | Tour Incity | | Lyon | 200 metres (660 ft) | 39 | 2015 | Tallest building in France outside the Greater Paris area |
| 6 | Tour Majunga | | Paris (La Defense) | 194 metres (636 ft) | 42 | 2013 | |
| 7 | Tour Total | | Paris (La Defense) | 187 metres (614 ft) | 47 | 1985 | |
| 8 | Tour T1 | | Paris (La Defense) | 185 metres (607 ft) | 37 | 2008 | |
| 9 | Tour Granite | | Paris (La Defense) | 183 metres (600 ft) | 36 | 2008 | |
| 10 | Tour Duo 1 | | Paris | 180 metres (590 ft) | 39 | 2021 | |
| 11 | Tour CB21 | | Paris (La Defense) | 179 metres (587 ft) | 45 | 1974 | |
| 12 = | Tour Areva | | Paris (La Defense) | 178 metres (584 ft) | 43 | 1974 | |
| 12 = | Tour Saint-Gobain | | Paris (La Defense) | 178 metres (584 ft) | 44 | 2019 | |
| 14 = | Tour D2 | | Paris (La Defense) | 171 metres (561 ft) | 37 | 2014 | |
| 14 = | Tour To-Lyon | | Lyon | 171 metres (561 ft) | 43 | 2023 | |
| 16 = | Tour Chassagne | | Paris (La Defense) | 167 metres (548 ft) | 37 | 1995 | |
| 16 = | Tour Alicante | | Paris (La Defense) | 167 metres (548 ft) | 37 | 1995 | |
| 16 = | Tour Trinity | | Paris (La Defense) | 167 metres (548 ft) | 33 | 2020 | |
| 19 = | Tour Part-Dieu | | Lyon | 165 metres (541 ft) | 41 | 1977 | |
| 19 = | Tour Légende | | Paris (La Defense) | 165 metres (541 ft) | 41 | 2001 | |
| 21 = | Tour Carpe Diem | | Paris (La Defense) | 162 metres (531 ft) | 38 | 2013 | |
| 21 = | Cœur Défense | | Paris (La Defense) | 162 metres (531 ft) | 40 | 2001 | |
| 23 = | Tribunal de Paris | | Paris | 160 metres (520 ft) | 41 | 2018 | |
| 23 = | Tour Alto | | Paris (La Defense) | 160 metres (520 ft) | 38 | 2020 | |
| 25 = | Tour Adria | | Paris (La Defense) | 155 metres (509 ft) | 40 | 2002 | |
| 25 = | Tour Egée | | Paris (La Defense) | 155 metres (509 ft) | 39 | 1999 | |
| 27 | Tour Ariane | | Paris (La Defense) | 152 metres (499 ft) | 35 | 1975 | |
| 28 | Tour CMA-CGM | | Marseille | 147 metres (482 ft) | 33 | 2010 | |
| 29 | Tour Bretagne | | Nantes | 144 metres (472 ft) | 31 | 1976 | |
| 30 | Tour CBX | | Paris (La Defense) | 142 metres (466 ft) | 36 | 2005 | |
| 31 | Hyatt Regency Paris Étoile | | Paris | 137 metres (449 ft) | 35 | 1974 | |
| 32 = | Tour Défense 2000 | | Paris (La Defense) | 136 metres (446 ft) | 47 | 1974 | |
| 32 = | La Marseillaise | | Marseille | 136 metres (446 ft) | 31 | 2018 | |
| 34 | Tour Europlaza | | Paris (La Defense) | 135 metres (443 ft) | 30 | 1972 | |
| 35 | Tour Aurore | | Paris (La Defense) | 131 metres (430 ft) | 29 | 2022 | |
| 36 | Tour Eqho | | Paris (La Defense) | 130 metres (430 ft) | 41 | 1988 | |
| 37 = | Tour Silex 2 | | Lyon | 129 metres (423 ft) | 23 | 2021 | |
| 37 = | Tour Pleyel | | Paris (Carrefour Pleyel) | 129 metres (423 ft) | 35 | 1972 | |
| 39 | Tour Les Poissons | | Paris (La Defense) | 128 metres (420 ft) | 42 | 1970 | Originally stood 150 metres (492 ft) tall including the height of the barometer which has been removed since 2006 |
| 40 | Tour Michelet | | Paris (La Defense) | 127 metres (417 ft) | 34 | 1985 | |
| 41 | Tour France | | Paris (La Defense) | 126 metres (413 ft) | 40 | 1973 | |
| 42 | Tour La Villette | | Paris (Aubervilliers) | 125 metres (410 ft) | 35 | 1972 | |
| 42 = | Tour Duo 2 (Tours Duo) | | Paris | 125 metres (410 ft) | 27 | 2021 | |
| 44 | Tour Prélude | | Paris | 123 metres (404 ft) | 39 | 1979 | |
| 44 = | Tour W | | Paris (La Defense) | 122 metres (400 ft) | 33 | 1974 | |
| 44 = | Les Mercuriales - Tour Ponant | | Paris (Bagnolet) | 122 metres (400 ft) | 33 | 1975 | |
| 44 = | Les Mercuriales - Tour levant | | Paris (Bagnolet) | 122 metres (400 ft) | 33 | 1977 | |

== Tallest buildings under construction ==
| Rank | Name | Image | City | Height metres / feet | Floors | Estimated Completion | Notes |
|---|---|---|---|---|---|---|---|
| 1 | Tour Triangle | | Paris | 180 metres (590 ft) | 42 | 2026 | |

== Tallest proposed/approved buildings ==
| Rank | Name | Image | City | Height metres / feet | Floors | Estimated Completion | Notes |
|---|---|---|---|---|---|---|---|
| 1 = | Hermitage Plaza I | | Paris | 323 metres (1,060 ft) | 86 | ? | |
| 1 = | Hermitage Plaza II | | Paris | 323 metres (1,060 ft) | 86 | ? | |
| 3 | Tour Sister I | | Paris (La Defense) | 229 metres (751 ft) | 55 | 2028 | |
| 4 | Tour des Jardins de l'Arche | | Paris (La Defense) | 206 metres (676 ft) | | 2028 | |
| 5 | Tours Odyssey (C/) | | Paris (La Defense) | 189 metres (620 ft) | 41 | 2028 | |
| 6 | Tour de Charenton | | Paris (Charenton-le-Pont) | 180 metres (590 ft) | | 2028 | |
| 7 | Tours Odyssey (O/) | | Paris (La Defense) | 176 metres (577 ft) | | 2028 | |
| 8 | Tour Monge | | Paris (La Defense) | 170 metres (560 ft) | | 2031 | |
| 9 | Tour Occitanie | | Toulouse | 155 metres (509 ft) | 40 | 2028 | |
| 10 | Tour Sister II | | Paris (La Defense) | 131 metres (430 ft) | | 2027 | |
| 11 | Tours Odyssey (D/) | | Paris (La Defense) | 103 metres (338 ft) | | 2028 | |

== See also ==
- List of tallest buildings and structures in the Paris region
