= Alpha Repertory Television Service =

Defunct American cable TV channel

- Country: United States
- Broadcast area: Nationwide
- Affiliates: Nickelodeon

Programming
- Language: English
- Picture format: 480i (SDTV)

Ownership
- Owner: Hearst/ABC Video Services

History
- Launched: April 12, 1981; 45 years ago
- Closed: February 1, 1984; 42 years ago
- Replaced by: A&E

The Alpha Repertory Television Service (ARTS) was an American cable television network that was owned by Hearst/ABC Video Services (now A+E Networks), a joint venture between the Hearst Corporation and the American Broadcasting Company (ABC). The network, which operated nightly on the channel space of Nickelodeon, focused mainly on fine arts programming. It merged with The Entertainment Channel in 1984 to become the Arts & Entertainment Network (A&E).

== History ==
=== Early history ===
By the early 1980s, cable television had reached millions of American households and was starting to draw significant audiences away from the "Big Three" broadcast television networks. All three networks saw opportunities to expand into cable television in order to protect and grow their audiences, and they all experimented with niche programming. In fact, all three traditional networks introduced arts-related channels within one year of each other. CBS launched CBS Cable in 1981, which focused on "art house" and critical acclaimed programs; NBC, meanwhile, launched the similarly formatted premium cable network The Entertainment Channel on June 4, 1982.

ABC partnered with the Hearst Corporation to create its own arts-oriented service, the Alpha Repertory Television Service. ARTS launched on April 12, 1981, focusing on highbrow cultural fare such as opera, ballet, classical symphonic performances, dramatic theater productions and select foreign films (besides CBS Cable and the Entertainment Channel, ARTS also competed with Bravo and the Public Broadcasting Service). Many cable providers had limited channel bandwidth at that time over their headends; as a result, CBS Cable struggled to find channel carriage and an audience, eventually folding in late 1982. However, while ARTS fared no better in finding viewers, it shared channel space with Nickelodeon, signing on at 9:00 p.m. Eastern Time after the children's television network ended its broadcast day. That shared channel arrangement was a perfect symbiotic scheduling match for the two networks given their respective audience demographics (the target viewership of ARTS either did not have young children or had sent them to bed by the time the channel began its programming).

ARTS had somewhat lower programming costs than CBS Cable, with fewer (and less costly) original programs. Prime time was normally the most valuable airtime, but not for Nickelodeon – ARTS paid a very low rate to that network for its three evening satellite transponder hours, plus a repeat broadcast at 9:00 p.m. Pacific Time (according to Hearst executive Raymond E. Joslin, ARTS did not pay Nickelodeon at all for the first year, and paid a $1 million fee for the second year and $2 million for the third). Most cable providers that carried Nickelodeon also carried ARTS simply because of the convenience of the single channel feed. These factors combined to help keep the channel on the air more than twice as long as CBS Cable. Nonetheless, despite having a small but affluent audience ostensibly attractive to advertisers, Hearst/ABC could not turn a profit on ARTS. The network had carried limited advertising each hour, typically carrying low-key commercials for luxury products and services; often advertising slots went unfilled.

In 1982, it made a major move when the service launched an independent signal on Manhattan Cable and TelePrompter, which was separate from Nickelodeon, in a package that around the same time fellow Hearst-ABC service Daytime was launched.

=== Merger with The Entertainment Channel and relaunch as A&E ===
NBC had been facing a similar problem in finding a sufficiently large audience for The Entertainment Channel, which aired such expensive programming as BBC cultural imports from the United Kingdom and live broadcasts from Lincoln Center. The Entertainment Channel ended broadcasting on March 31, 1983, after receiving only approximately 45,000 subscribers by November 1982.

Hearst/ABC Video Services and NBC ultimately decided to merge ARTS and The Entertainment Channel to form a single service, the Arts & Entertainment Network (A&E), which launched on February 1, 1984; ABC would exit the partnership soon afterward (ironically, the Walt Disney Company, which bought ABC in 1996, would acquire an ownership interest in A&E in the early 1990s). A&E took over the transponder space held by ARTS, as well as that network's timeslot over Nickelodeon's channel space.

That summer, A&E announced that it would move the network to its own dedicated transponder and become a separate 24-hour cable channel to take better advantage of valuable satellite time. The move took place on January 1, 1985, with Nickelodeon expanding part of its programming schedule to fill the time period formerly held by A&E with more teen-oriented programming and displaying a test pattern screen after the network signed off later in the evening.

As a result of A&E's separation from Nickelodeon, MTV Networks President Bob Pittman commissioned Geraldine Laybourne, who served as general manager of Nickelodeon at the time, to develop programming to fill the vacated time period. Laybourne asked programming and branding consultants Fred Seibert and Alan Goodman, founders of Fred/Alan Inc. (who launched successful branding campaigns for MTV when it launched in 1981, and for Nickelodeon in 1984), to come up with programming ideas. Seibert and Goodman came up with the idea to launch a nighttime block of classic television series, modeled after the "Greatest Hits of All Time" oldies radio format, after being presented with over 200 episodes of the 1950s sitcom The Donna Reed Show. On July 1, 1985, Nick at Nite launched over Nickelodeon's channel space in the 8:00 p.m. to 6:00 a.m. Eastern and Pacific time period, featuring reruns of classic television series from the 1950s to the 1970s.

The merged A&E unit retained the same arts-focused and foreign drama programming for the next twenty years, though it eventually drifted towards a direction heavy towards reality television by 2008 and has long drifted away from the channel's original remit.
