= La Marseillaise (skyscraper) =

Skyscraper in Marseille, France

- Tour La Marseillaise (at left)
- Interactive map of the La Marseillaise area

General information
- Status: Completed
- Type: Office
- Location: Euroméditerranée, Marseille, France, Quai d'Arenc, Les Quais d'Arenc
- Coordinates: 43.3132425°N 5.3670030°E
- Construction started: 2015
- Completed: 2018
- Opening: 2018
- Owner: Caisse des Dépôts Group; CEPAC Immobilier; Swiss Life

Height
- Architectural: 135 m (443 ft)
- Tip: 135 m (443 ft)
- Top floor: 121.5 m (399 ft)

Technical details
- Material: Concrete; Steel
- Floor count: 31
- Floor area: 46,767 m^{2} (503,396 ft^{2})
- Lifts/elevators: 15

Design and construction
- Architects: Ateliers Jean Nouvel (Design); Tangram Architectes (Architect of Record)
- Developer: Constructa Urban Systems
- Structural engineer: Aedas (Design); SIDF (Engineer of Record)
- Main contractor: Vinci Construction

Website
- https://www.wtcmp.com/en/sky-center-la-marseillaise/

La Marseillaise is an office skyscraper in the Euroméditerranée, Marseille, France. It is part of Les Quais d'Arenc development complex and located near the CMA CGM Tower, the city's tallest building. It has 31 floors with an overall height of 135 m (443 ft). The building construction started in 2015 and finished in 2018. It was developed by Constructa Urban Systems and designed by Ateliers Jean Nouvel. It is known for its innovative tricolor facade design and ranked second in 2018 Emporis Skyscraper Award.

== Design ==
The building was designed to capture the reflection of the city's waterfront area. Its facade was painted in 27 different shades of red, white, and blue to represent the color of the sky, cloud, and the surrounding neighbourhoods. The tower also used light and fiber concrete as its structural material to give an impression of an unfinished work.

== See also ==
- List of tallest buildings in France
