= Tour Bretagne =

- Interactive map of the Tour Bretagne area

General information
- Status: In Use
- Type: Skyscraper
- Location: Nantes
- Coordinates: 47°13′01″N 1°33′31″W
- Construction started: September 30, 1971
- Opening: November 18, 1976

Height
- Antenna spire: 144 m (472 ft)
- Roof: 119 m (391 ft)

Technical details
- Floor count: 37
- Floor area: 16,000 m^{2} (172,000 sq ft)
- Lifts/elevators: 8

Design and construction
- Architect: Claude Devorsine
- Structural engineer: Marcel André

Tour Bretagne (Brittany Tower in English; Breton: Tour Breizh) opened on November 18, 1976, at 17:00, is a 37-story skyscraper situated in downtown Nantes between a main thoroughfare, Cours des 50 Otages, and Place Bretagne (Brittany square).

With a total height of 144 meters (472 feet), it dominates the skyline of the city of Nantes and is the third tallest building in France outside of Paris, after Tour Part-Dieu in Lyon and CMA CGM Tower in Marseille. Built on the water tank, the antennas reach 25 metres (82 ft) above the top floor.

Initiated by André Morice then Mayor of Nantes, the building was conceived by French architect Claude Devorsine in the 1960s. By the time of its completion in the 1970s, public aesthetics had changed and the building was an economic failure, remaining mostly empty for a long time. It later became used for government offices.

== History ==
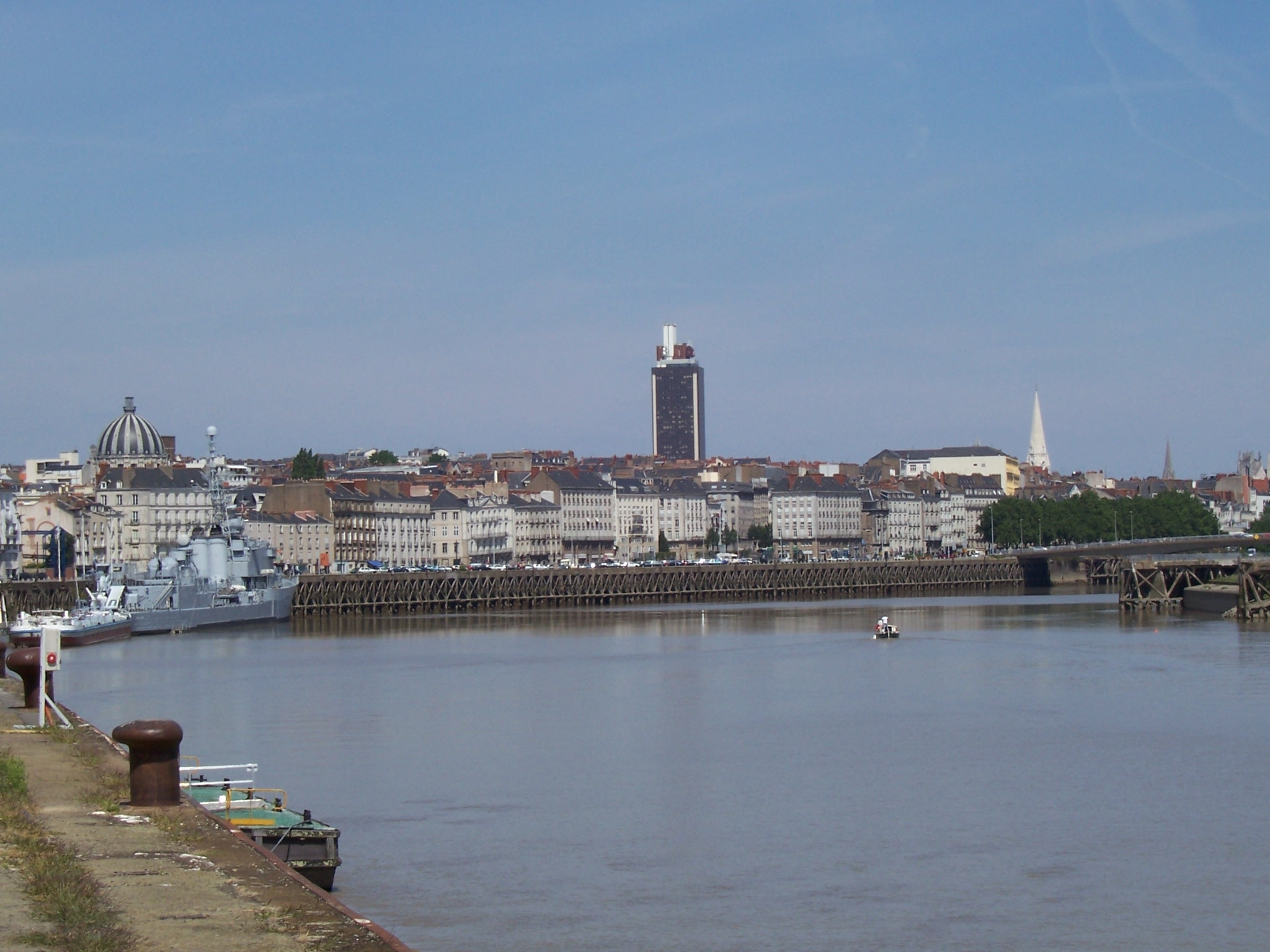
The building dominates Nantes' skyline

The tower stands on an old area in the center of the city called "Le Marchix". This old medieval quarter had been considered dirty and dangerous long before the 1943 American bombing which considerably damaged it.

During the post-war redevelopment, the construction of two important modernist buildings along Place de Bretagne, housing the Treasury General, the Social Security building and the main post office inspired officials to build a skyscraper nearby. Tour Bretagne was meant to represent the economic power of the city and to display it to the world.

In 1966, with the encouragement of the people of Nantes, a group called SELA (Société d'Equipement de Loire Atlantique) was put in charge of developing the project. SELA asked Claude Devorsine, a forgotten architect today, and Marcel André, an engineering advisor, to bring the project to reality. In 1968, the plan was to construct a six-story parking garage at the base of the tower, completed with a gas station, which the cars could access via an exterior ramp. The next three levels were to be a shopping mall with space for 25 boutiques and a restaurant. The offices would occupy the rest of floors except for the top floor, which would house a restaurant that would give panoramic views of the surrounding area.

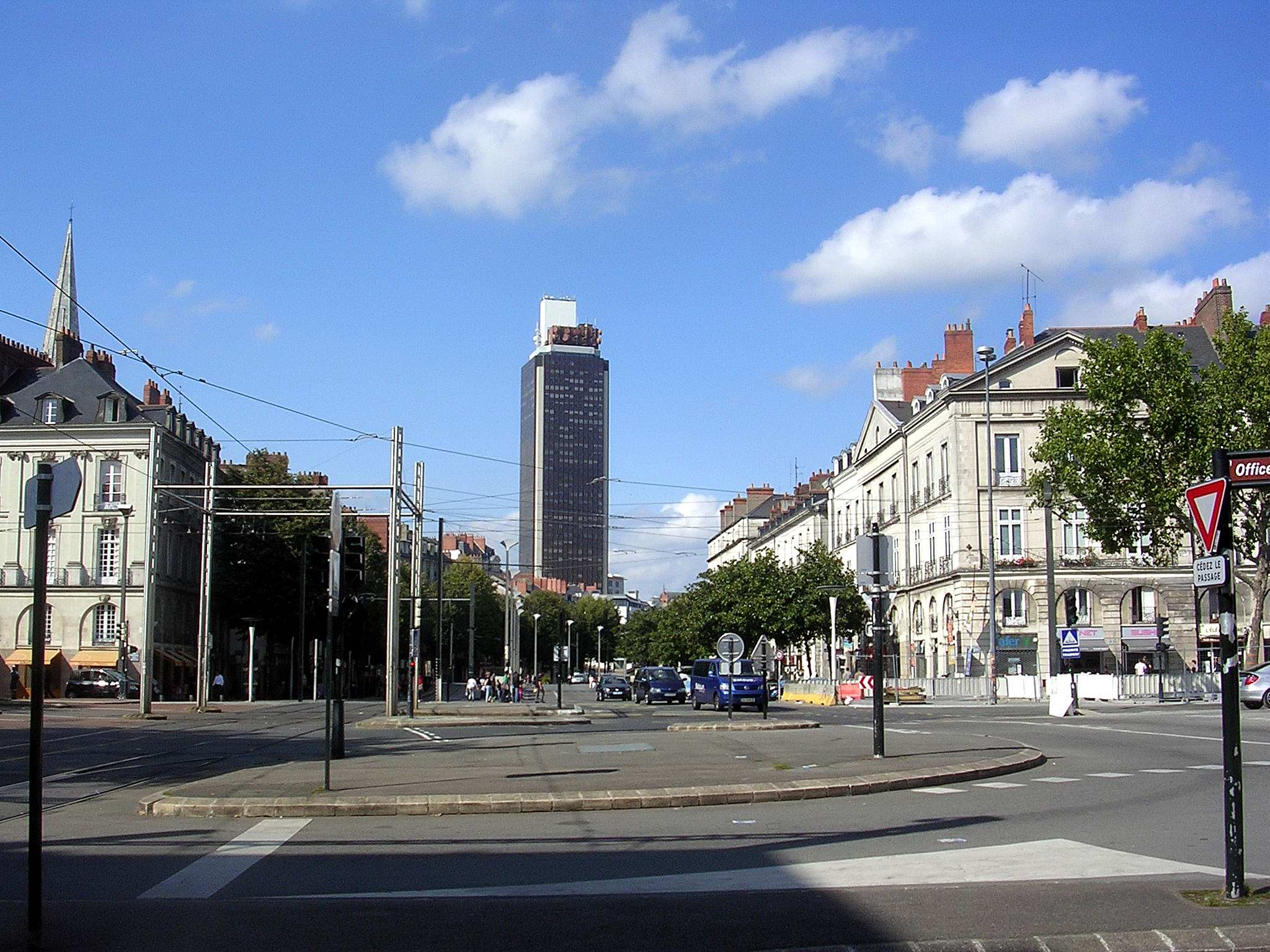
The tower and the Cours des 50-Otages

The work began on September 30, 1971, and was to be finished by summer 1974. However, the construction is protracted by a number of delays, mainly due to an unforeseen number of changes to the plans during construction. Finally, after five years of work, the tower was opened in 1976.

Once completed, the tower was a failure. Ten years had been necessary to plan and build it and mentalities had changed since the 1960s. The building was then seen as a symbol of an inhuman urbanism focused on profit and as an architectural error distorting the traditional cityscape.

It was an economic failure as well, remaining mostly empty for a long time, in part due to the high rent. The restaurant on the 29th floor was soon closed due to technical problems and free visits to the observation deck were stopped after frequent suicides. Furthermore, no businesses opened at the base of the tower as had been initially envisioned. To utilize the 16,000 m^{2} (170,000 sq ft) of office space, the city government decided to move a part of its administrative offices to the tower.

== Technical details ==
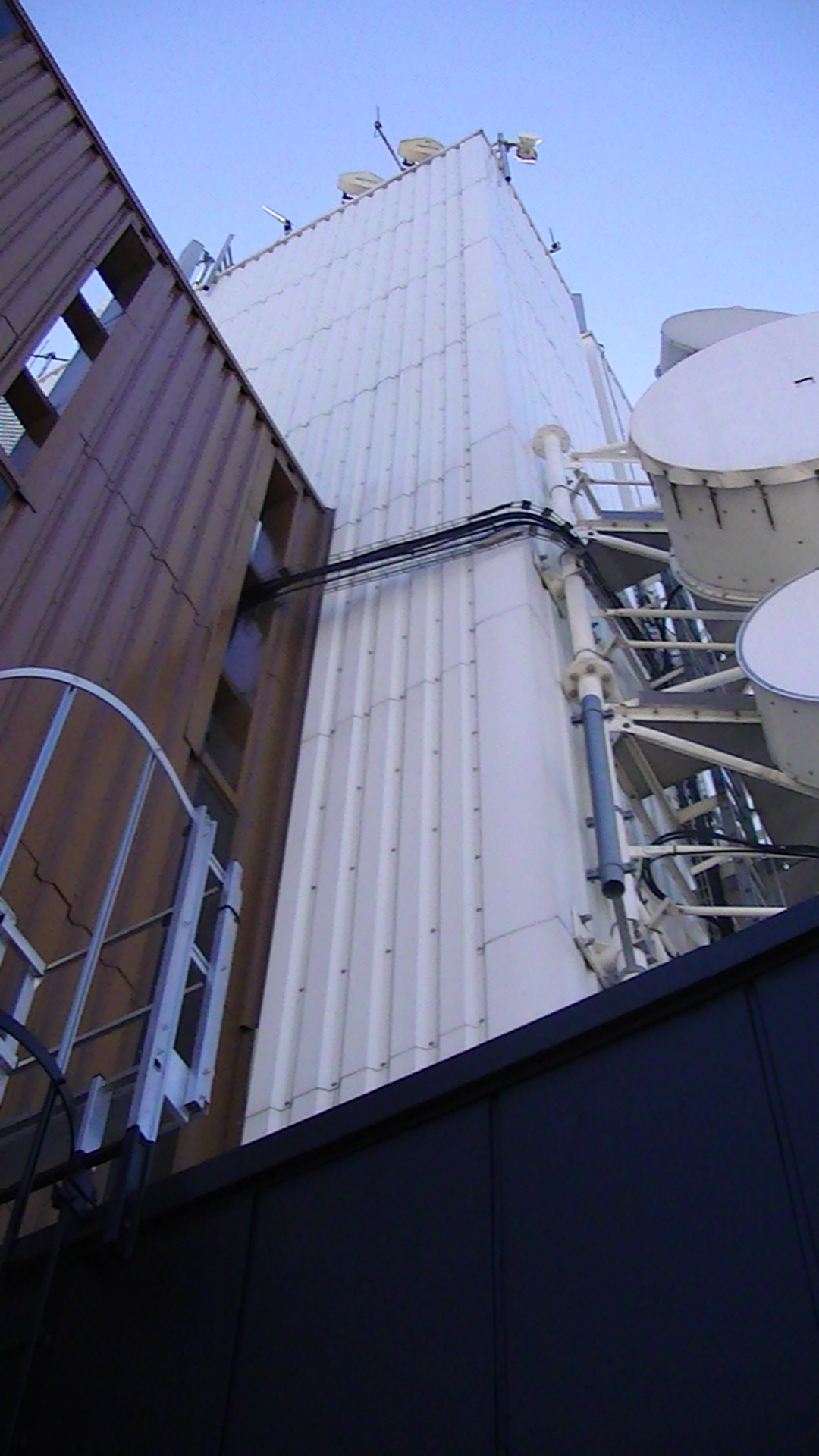
Water tanks on top of the tower surrounded by antennas

The tower, which measures 144 m (472 ft), has eight elevators, seven escalators and a water tank on the roof that can hold 91,000 L (24,000 US gal). Due to change in plans, the building now has seven levels of parking, three "ground floors", a "level zero" (which is situated 20 m (66 ft) above street level) and 29 floors of offices topped by a few floors containing machinery. The Tax Bureau, Nantes Metrocenter, and the offices of the city Employment Bureau occupy three-quarters of the buildings floorspace. Nearly 800 people work in the tower each day. The tower is managed by a group of co-owners composed of mainly banks but also the city government.

== The tower today ==
By the end of the 20th century, the inhabitants of Nantes, after long lamenting the tower's rigid and monolithic presence, have begun to begrudgingly accept the tower. One can see the gradual acceptance of the tower as it has begun to appear on a number of post cards, once thought unimaginable, and is mentioned on leaflets distributed by the tourism office.

The 32nd floor terrace was reopened on June 15, 2012, after being closed for more than 10 years. Fully refurbished and secured, it hosts a restaurant and its layout suggests a huge bird's nest, hence the restaurant's name, Le Nid ("The Nest"). The terrace gives a full 360-degree view on the city and its surroundings.

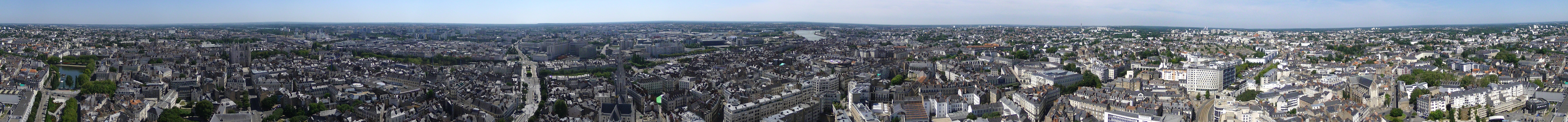
A panoramic view from the top terrace

== Gallery ==
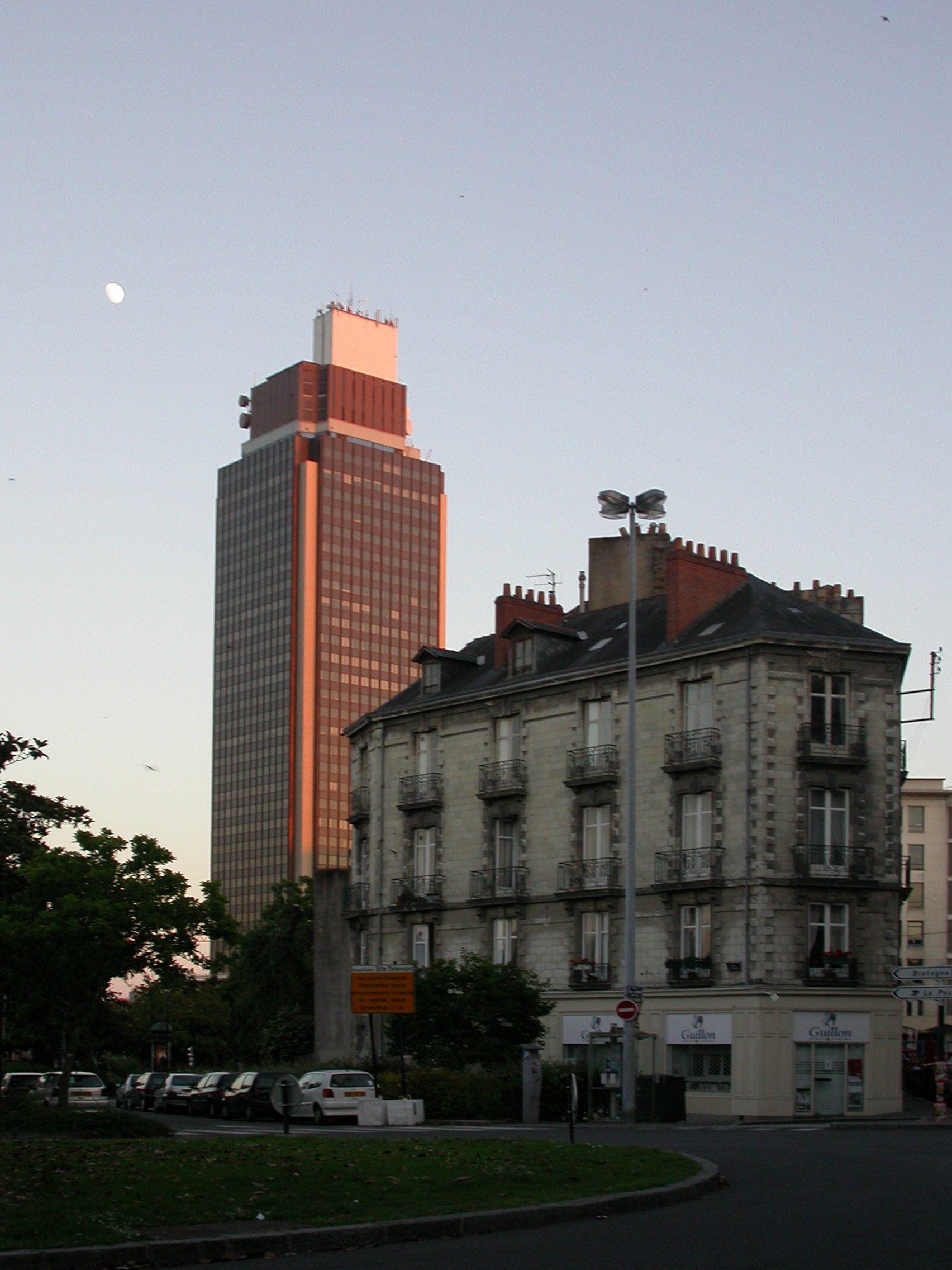

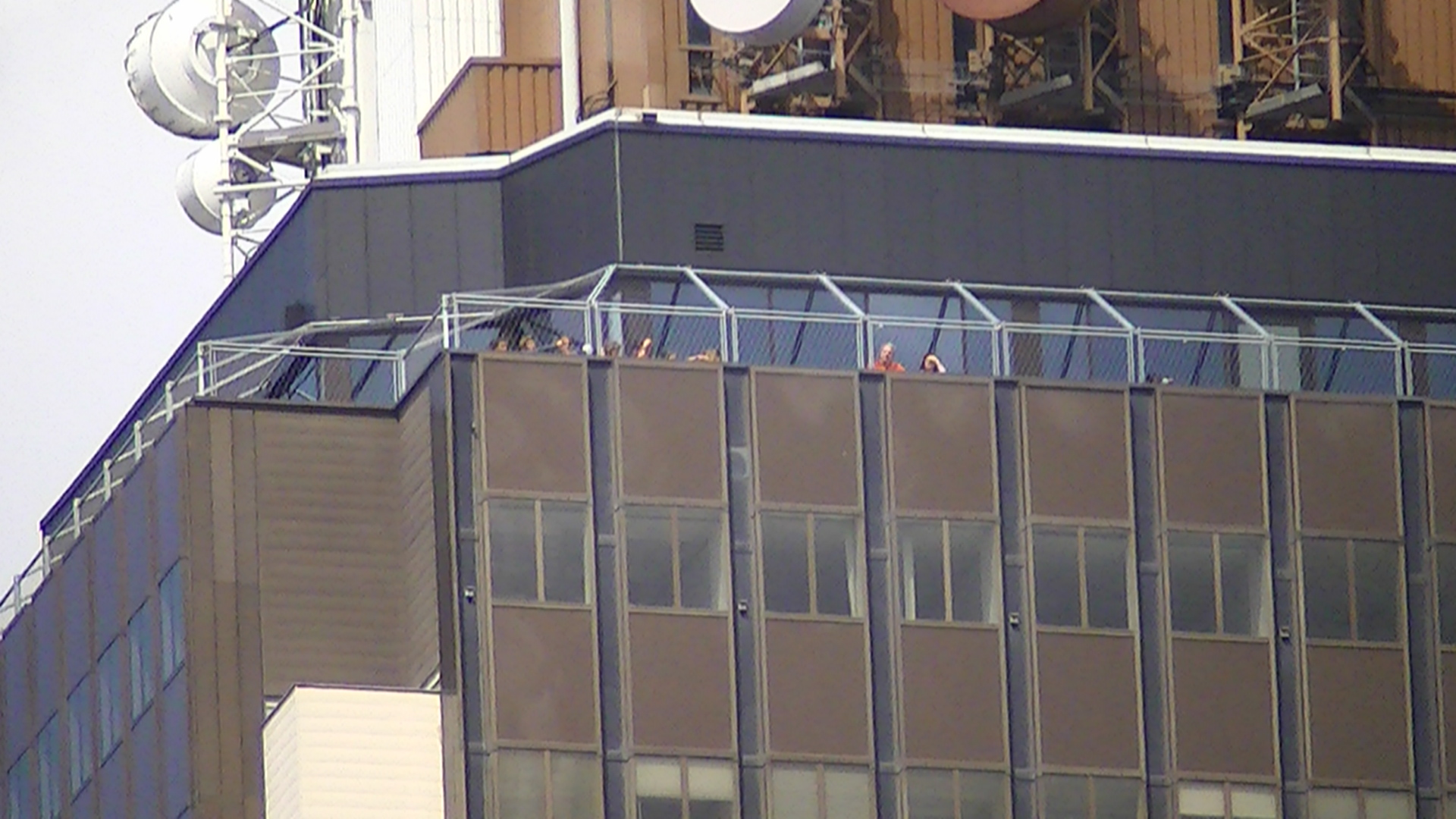
Observation deck

== See also ==
- Skyscraper
- List of tallest buildings in France
