= Tour First =

Office skyscraper in Courbevoie, in La Défense

- Tour First in 2011
- Interactive map of the Tour First area
- Former names: Tour AXA; Tour UAP; Tour Assur; CB31

General information
- Status: Completed
- Type: Commercial offices
- Architectural style: Modernism
- Location: 1 Place des Saisons; La Défense, Courbevoie, France
- Coordinates: 48.8889°N 2.2517°E
- Completed: 1974
- Renovated: 2007 –2011
- Owner: Beacon Capital Partners

Height
- Antenna spire: 231 m (758 ft)
- Roof: 225 m (738 ft)

Technical details
- Floor count: 52
- Floor area: 86,707 m^{2} (933,310 sq ft)
- Lifts/elevators: 28

Design and construction
- Architects: Michel Stenzel; Pierre Dufau; Jean-Pierre Dacbert
- Engineer: Iosis Bâtiments
- Main contractor: GFC + Bouygues

Renovating team
- Architects: Kohn Pedersen Fox Associates; SRA Architects

Tour First (previously known as Tour UAP between 1974 and 1998, and as Tour Axa between 1998 and 2007) is an office skyscraper in the La Défense business district of the metropolitan area of Paris. Built in 1974, the tower stands at 231 m (758 ft) tall with 52 floors and is the current second tallest building in France.

== History ==
The tower was built in 1974 by Bouygues for the Union des assurances de Paris (UAP) insurance company. The building was 159 m (522 ft) at that time. Its ground shape was in the form of a three-pointed star whose branches were separated each by a 120° angle. This particular shape was chosen to symbolize the merger of the three French insurance companies that were at the origin of UAP. The tower was renamed Tour Axa when UAP was bought by the Axa insurance company in 1996.

Large-scale renovation of the tower began in 2007 and was completed in 2011. The exterior appearance of the building was completely changed, with extra height added to the tower. The renovated tower, now known as Tour First, is 225 m (738 ft) at roof height, and 231 m (758 ft) including its spire, with a total floor space of 86,707 m^{2} (933,310 sq ft). It is currently the tallest skyscraper in France, only surpassed in height by the Eiffel Tower.

Another Axa tower exists in New York City, US, which is 228.6 m (751 ft) tall; Tour AXA in Montreal, Quebec, Canada was completed in 1974 and is 104 m (341 ft).

== Usage ==
The audit and consulting firm Ernst & Young (EY) installed 3,400 people in the tower at the end of 2011, which occupies a total of 37,000 m^{2} (400,000 sq ft) spread over 36 floors.

The credit insurance company Euler Hermes installed a thousand people on 21,000 m^{2} (230,000 sq ft) at the end of April 2012, occupying the 32nd to 45th floors as well as two floors at the podium of the tower, that is to say at its foot.

In April 2017, the 240 employees of the head office of Laboratoires Expanscience (Mustela, Piasclédine 300, etc.) have moved into the 8th and 9th floors, covering almost 4,000 m^{2} (43,000 sq ft). The tower indicates the next day's weather by lighting up in different colors.

The Kwerk coworking space has been a tenant over two floors of the building since June 2017. It offers 390 spaces divided into open and closed offices, and contains a giant trompe-l'oeil library 11 meters high on the 11th floor. These spaces were entirely designed by the designer and co-founder of Kwerk Albert Angel.

== Gallery ==
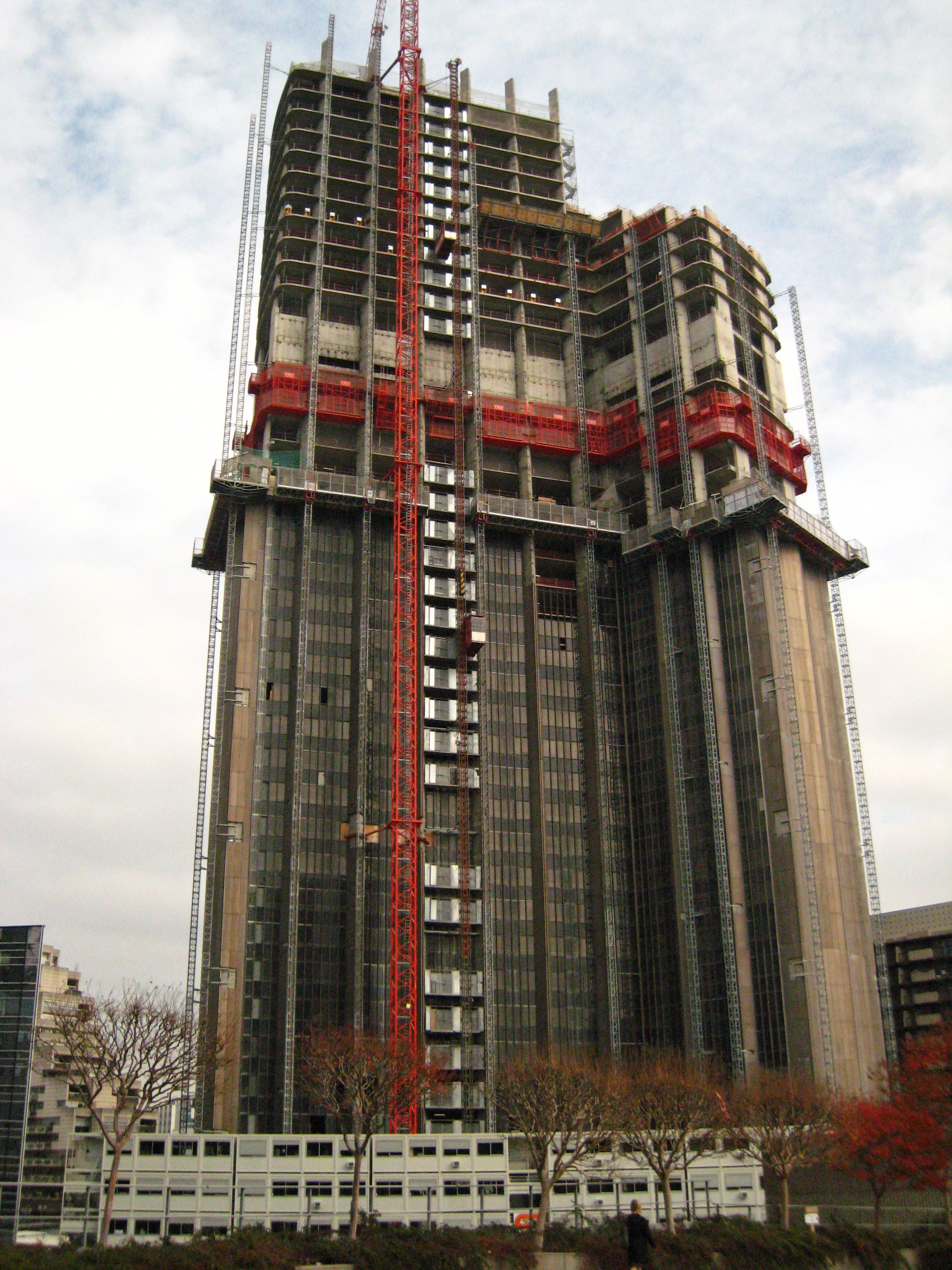
The construction renovation site in October 2008

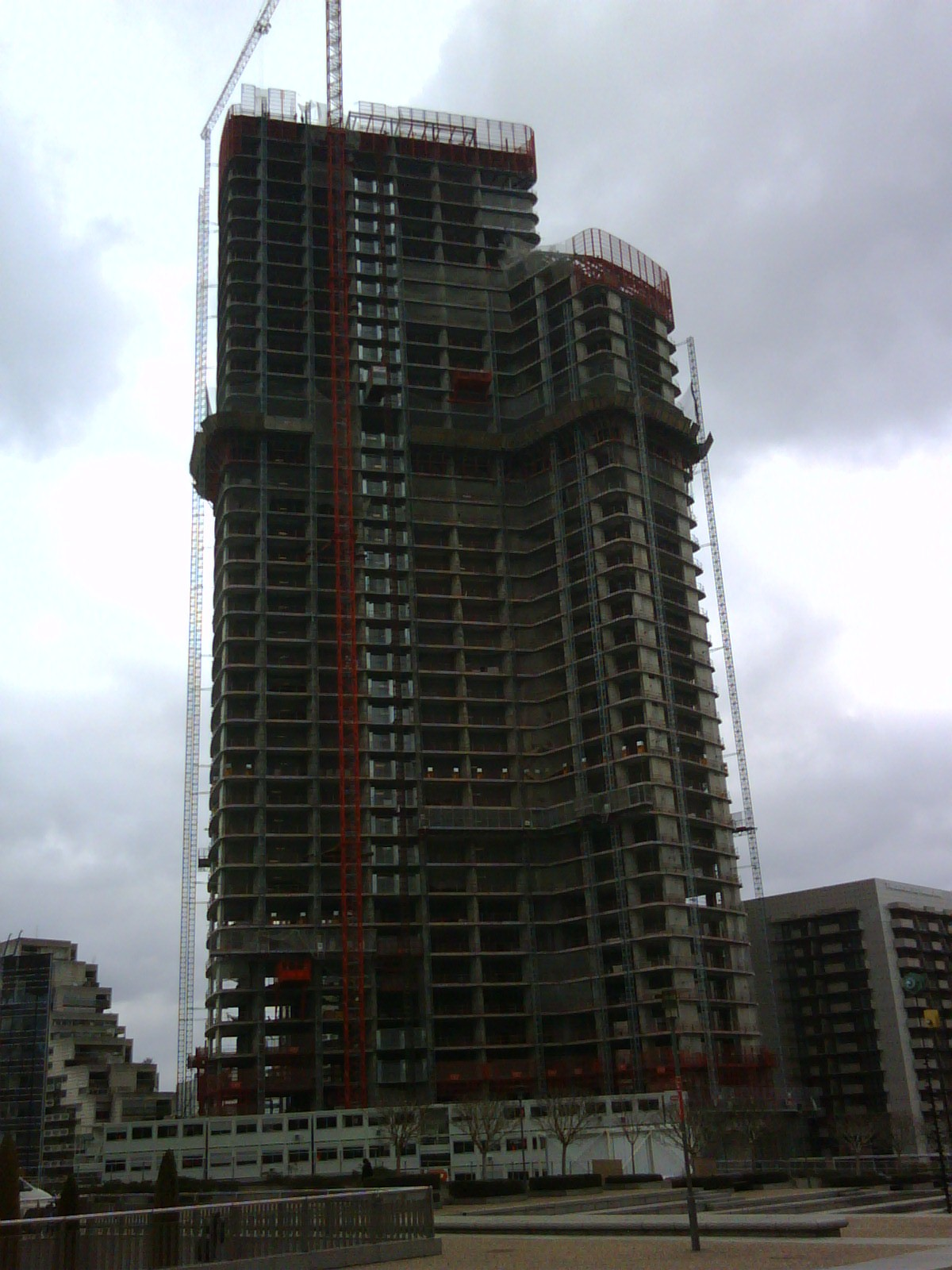
March 2009

== See also ==
- La Défense
- List of tallest buildings and structures in the Paris region
- List of tallest buildings in France

Records
Preceded by Tour Montparnasse	Tallest building in France; 2011–2025; 231 metres (758 ft)	Succeeded by The Link
