= Wylie F. L. Tuttle =

American real estate developer

Wylie Tuttle
- Born: Waylie Fay Leon Tuttle
- Died: April 5, 2002; Rock Hall, Maryland
- Education: Columbia University (BA)
- Occupation: real estate developer
- Known for: developing Tour Montparnasse

Wylie Fay Leon Tuttle (died April 5, 2002) was an American real estate developer who was behind the construction of the Tour Montparnasse, the tallest building in Europe upon its completion in 1972.

== Biography ==
A native New Yorker, Tuttle (born in 1923) graduated from Columbia College in 1944. He was a member of the Delta Phi fraternity and rowed for the varsity crew team. He was a Navy pilot in the Pacific theater during World War II. After the war, he joined the real estate firm known then as Brown, Wheelock, Harris & Stevens in New York. He then founded Collins-Tuttle with Arthur Collins in 1954. He served as president of the company until he died.

Tuttle seized the opportunity that arose out of Paris' growing need for urban development and decided to use American building expertise to help construct a modern landmark, stating at the time that "Paris needs a skyscraper and the competition here isn't as strong." Tuttle and his associate, Herbert Papock, eventually enlisted a consortium of 17 French insurance companies and seven banks in the $140-million multiple-building project that became known as the Tour Montparnasse. The financing was led by French industrialist Jean-Claude Aaron.

After the complex was finished, Tuttle turned over the management to his French partners. After his initial success in France, he continued his real estate ventures across the United States, and was also a founder and the first president of the Young Men's Real Estate Association.

Tuttle maintained a residence at Rock Hall, Maryland, that was designed by the architect Paul Rudolph in 1984 and built in 1986. He died on April 5, 2002, at his home at age 79. His daughter, Alexandra Tuttle, correspondent for The Wall Street Journal, was killed on September 22, 1993, when the military plane on which she was flying was hit by an Abkhazian ground-to-air missile. She was on her way to Georgia, where she was covering the Civil War after the collapse of the Soviet Union.
