= The Link (building) =

Mixed-use skyscraper complex in Paris, France

- Tour The link (French)

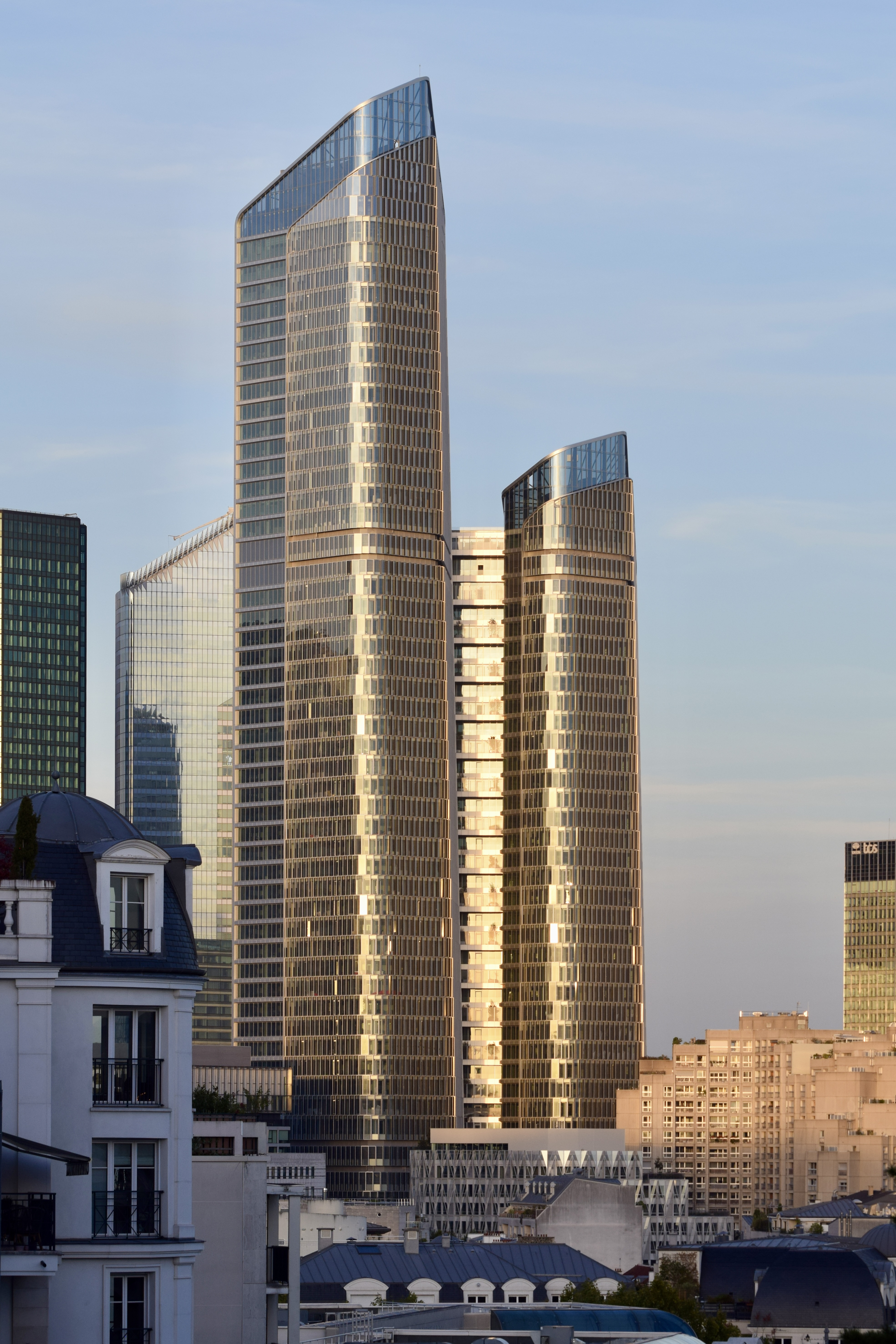
- The Link in October 2025
- Interactive map of the The Link area

General information
- Status: Completed
- Type: Office
- Architectural style: Neo-futurism
- Location: Puteaux, Paris, France, 6 Cr Michelet, Puteaux, Paris
- Coordinates: 48.88772°N 2.24798°E
- Construction started: 2021
- Completed: 2025
- Owner: Groupama

Height
- Roof: 242 m (794 ft)

Technical details
- Structural system: Concrete
- Floor count: 52
- Floor area: 135,000 m^{2} (1,450,000 sq ft)

Design and construction
- Architect: Philippe Chiambaretta
- Developer: Redman
- Main contractor: Vinci SA

Website
- thelink-ladefense.com

The Link is a mixed-use skyscraper building development located in Puteaux, France. It is part of the La Défense business district. Completed in 2025, the tallest tower stands at 242 m (794 ft) tall with 52 floors, making it the tallest skyscraper in the Paris metropolitan area and in France, and the second tallest structure overall, after the Eiffel Tower.

The tower will house the new headquarters of French energy company TotalEnergies, which is currently located in Tour Total.

== History ==
In July 2017, Total has chosen the Link tower to house its next headquarters. Between 5,500 and 6,000 employees, previously located in the Coupole and Michelet towers, will be grouped together in this new skyscraper. Its construction cost was estimated at one billion euros in October 2021.

On June 11, 2020, Groupama announced the groundbreaking of The Link with the start of the demolition work on the existing building, which would be followed in 2021 by foundation work on the new towers.

== Architecture ==
The complex consists of two office towers called Arche and Seine, standing at 242 and 178 meters high respectively, connected by 35 platforms called "links", a term derived from the English "link" and meaning "connection". The tallest tower will house the new headquarters of TotalEnergies, currently located in the Coupole Tower.

The Link project comprises approximately 130,000 m² of office space. It is located near a green space. The building includes duplex floors of approximately 6,000 m² and high ceilings, to allow internal pedestrian movement and limit the use of elevators.

The tower, by its height and position, is designed to visually rebalance the historic Axe historique.

The building features a double-skin insulating façade incorporating photovoltaic panels and aims to reduce energy consumption by 50% compared to the towers previously occupied by the company. Accessibility to the district from Puteaux is to be improved through the renovation of Cours Michelet.

== Gallery ==
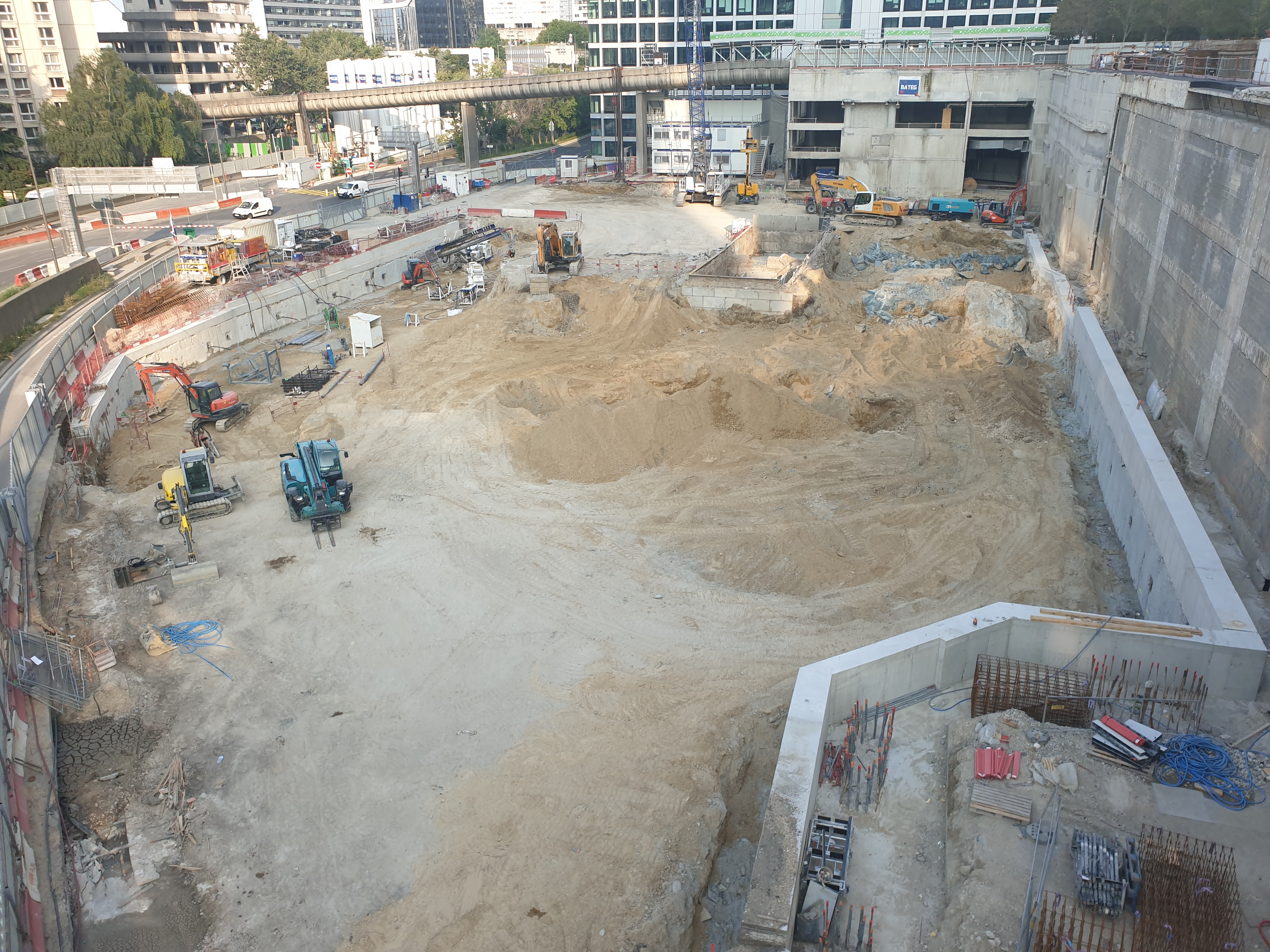
Construction site in August 2021

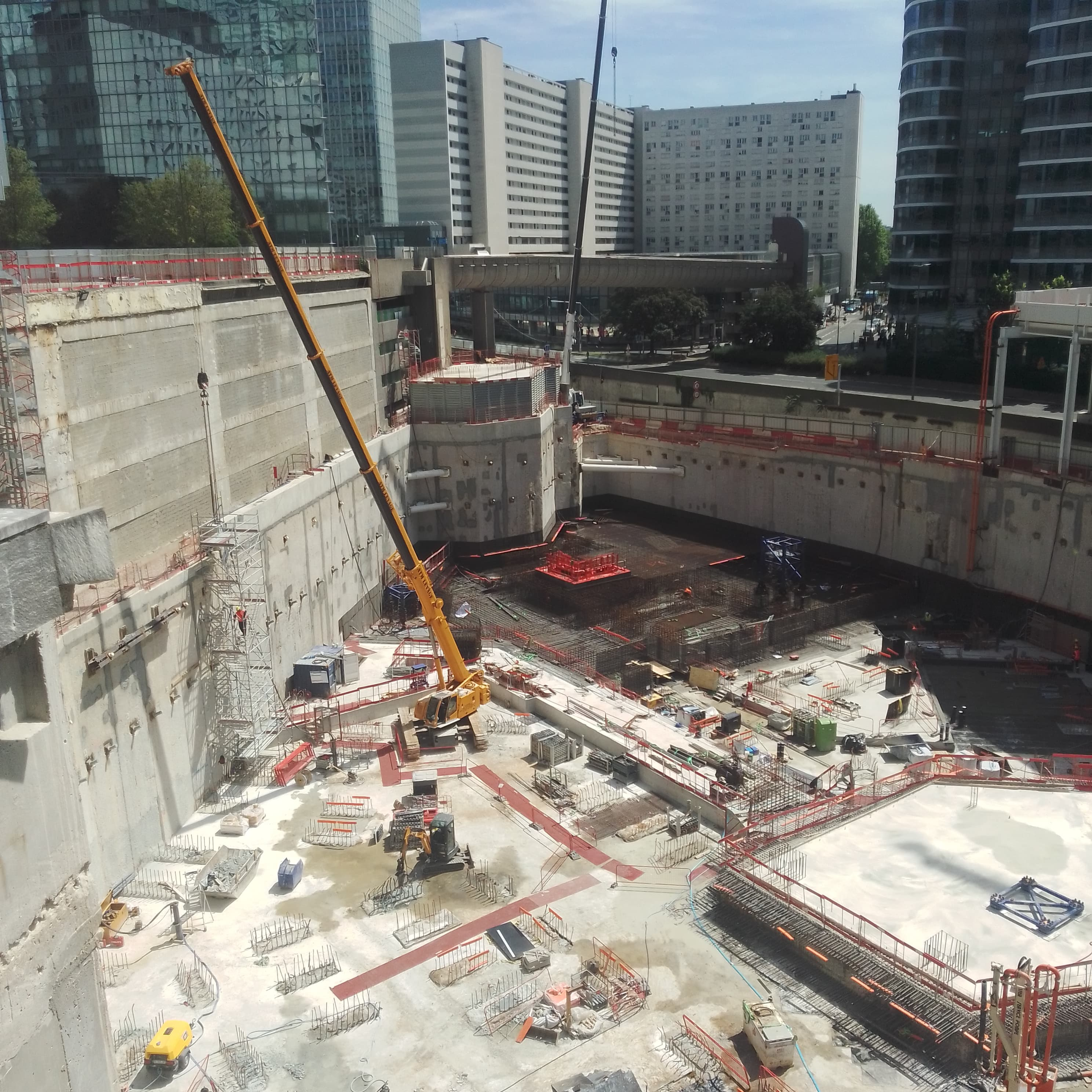
May 2022

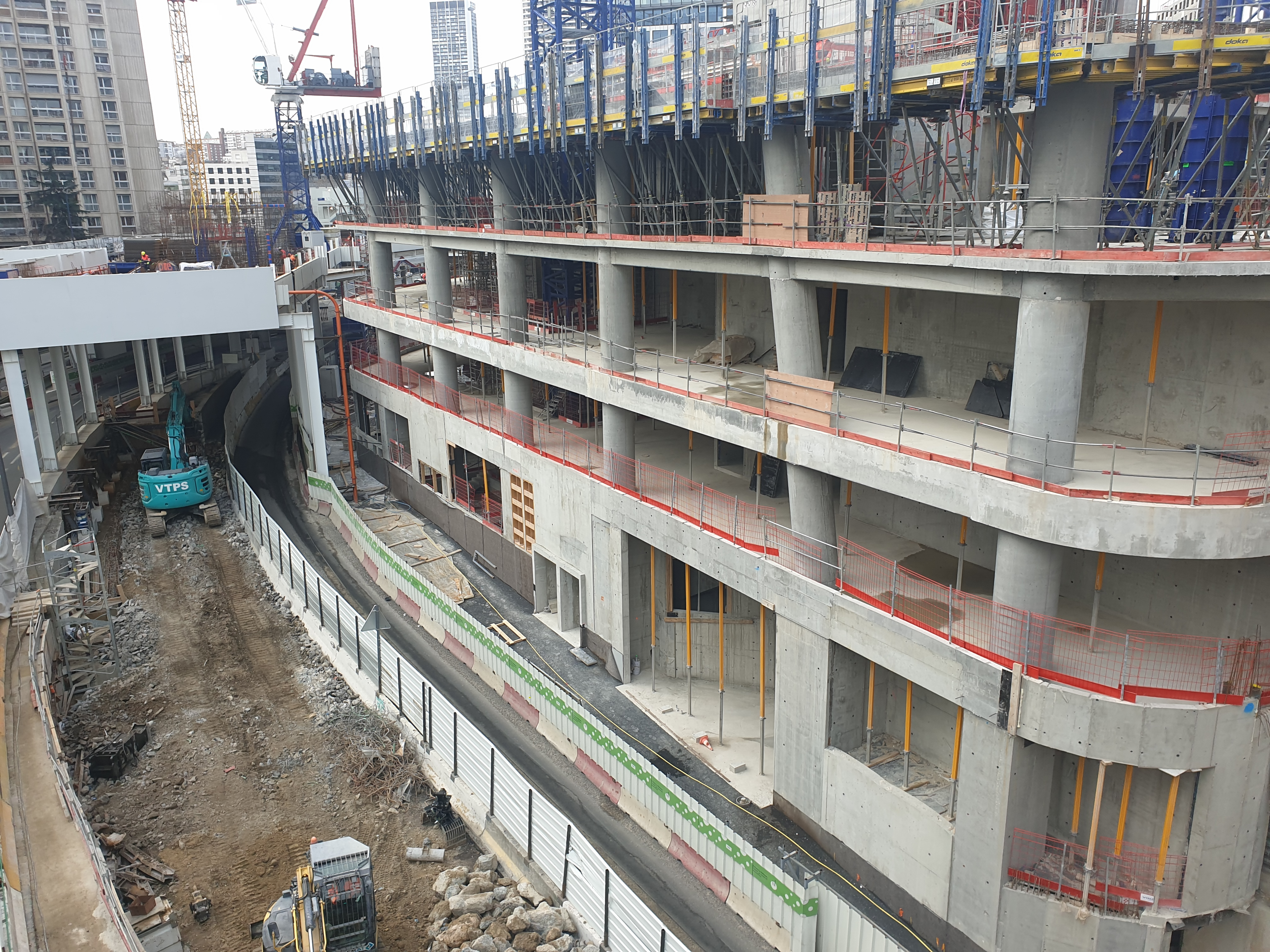
January 2023

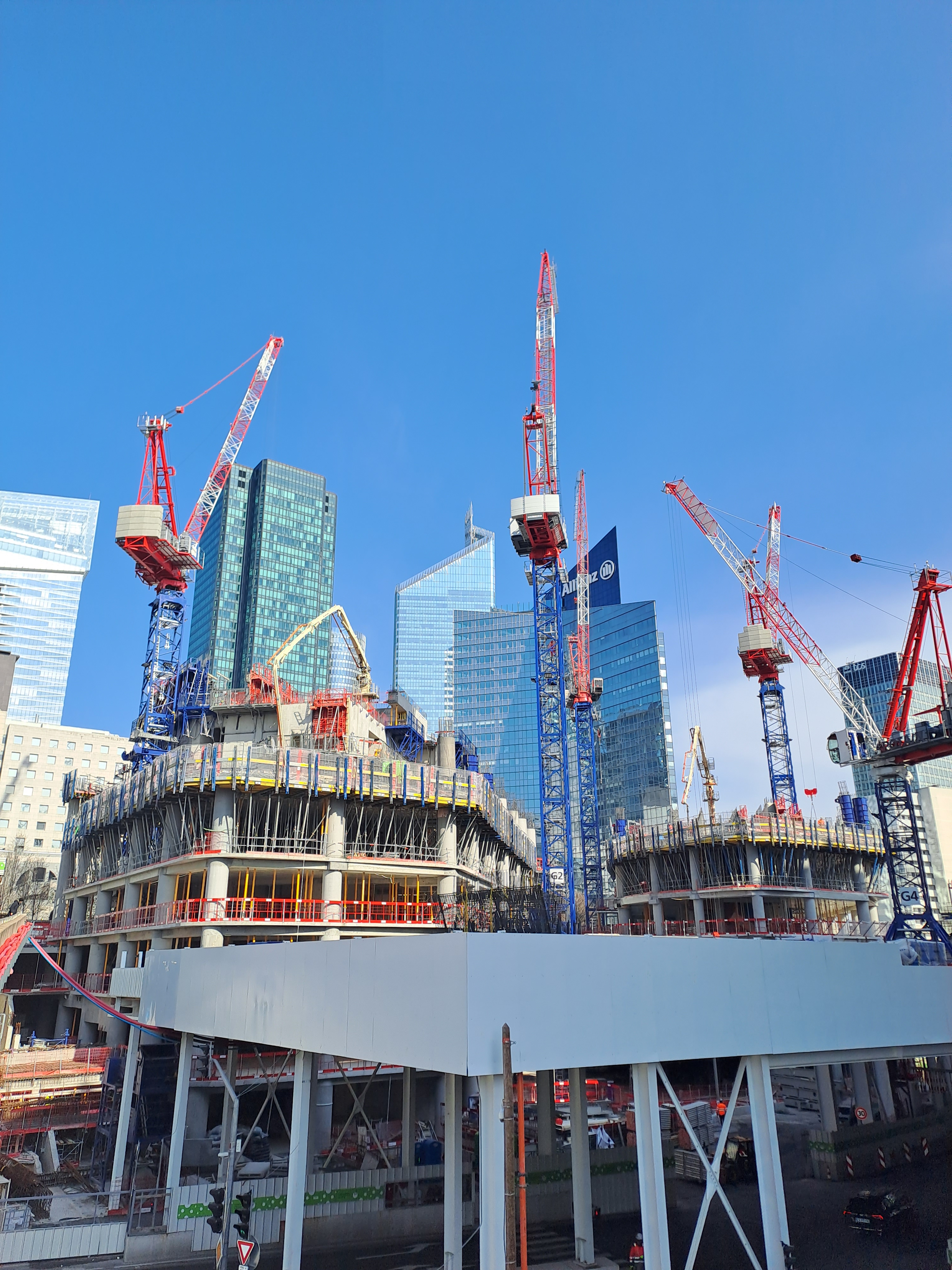
March 2023

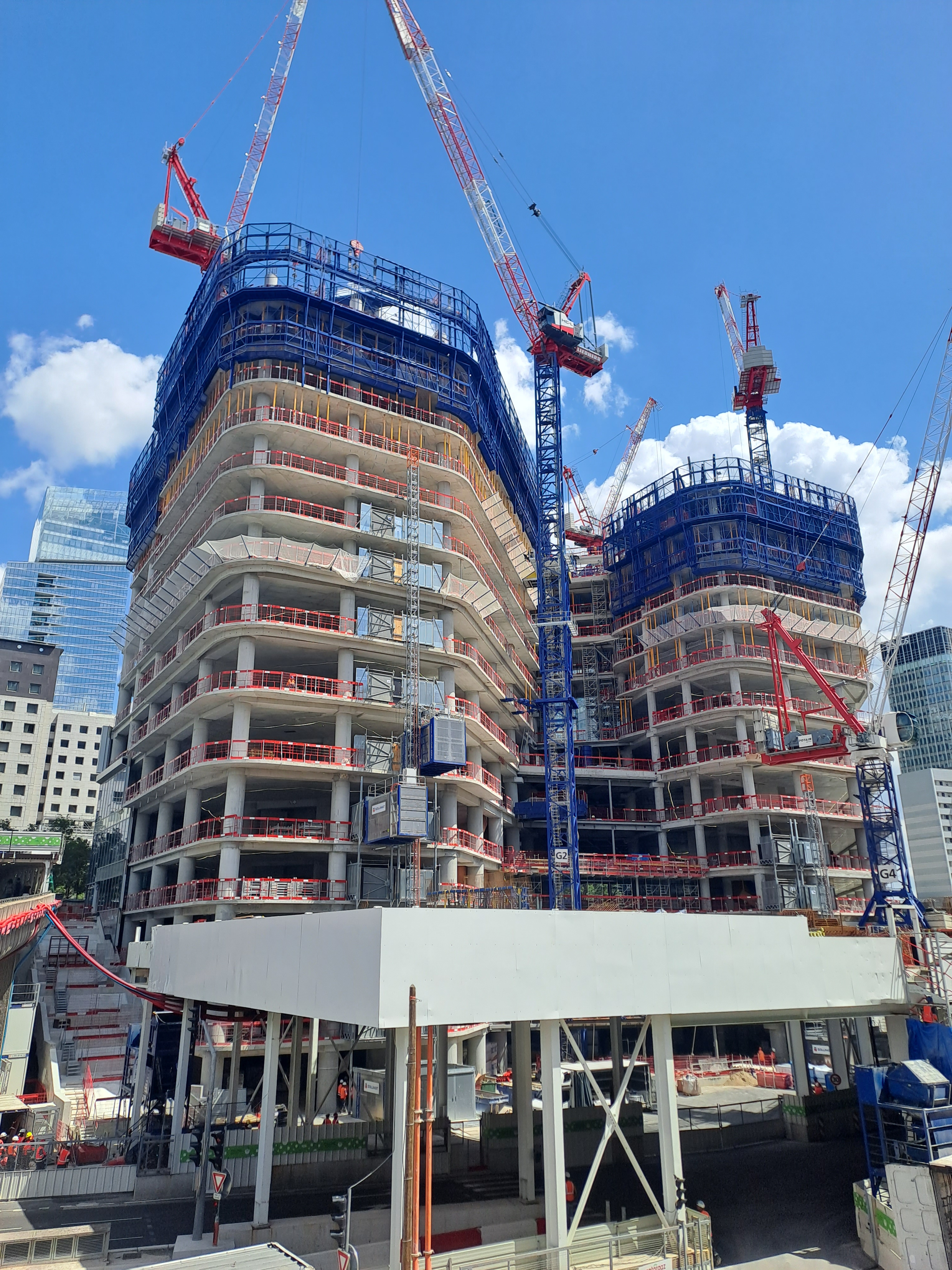
July 2023

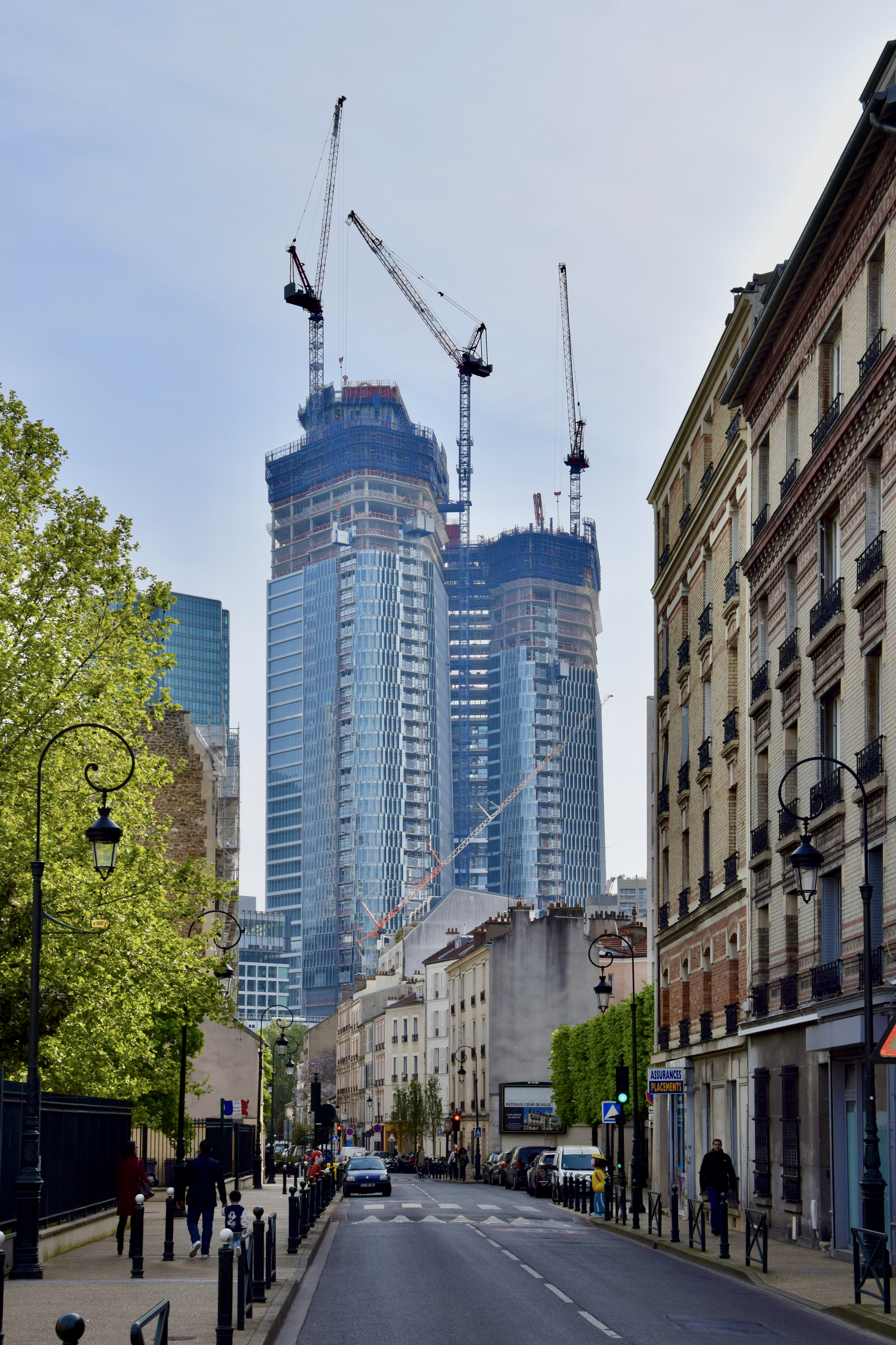
April 2024

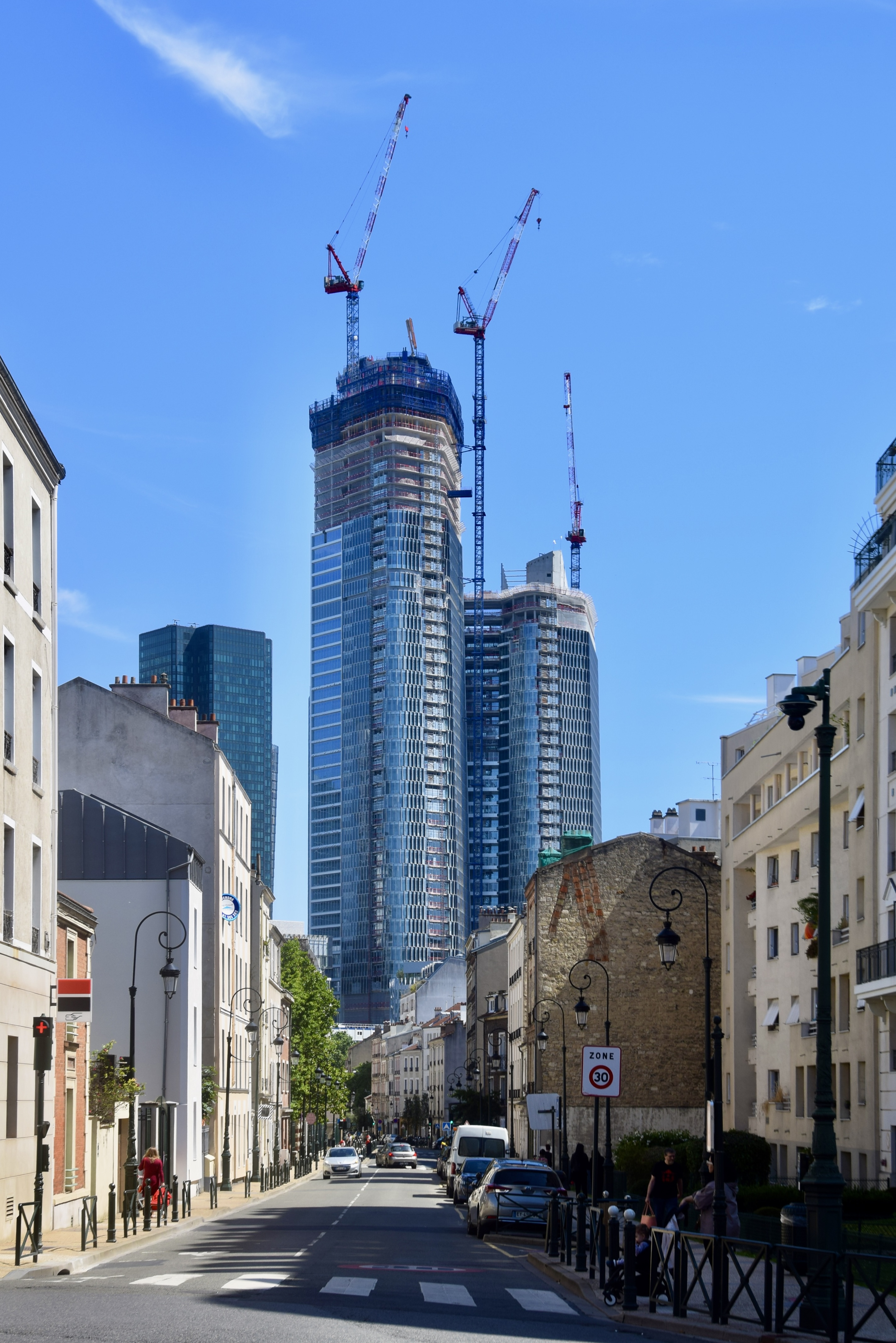
July 2024

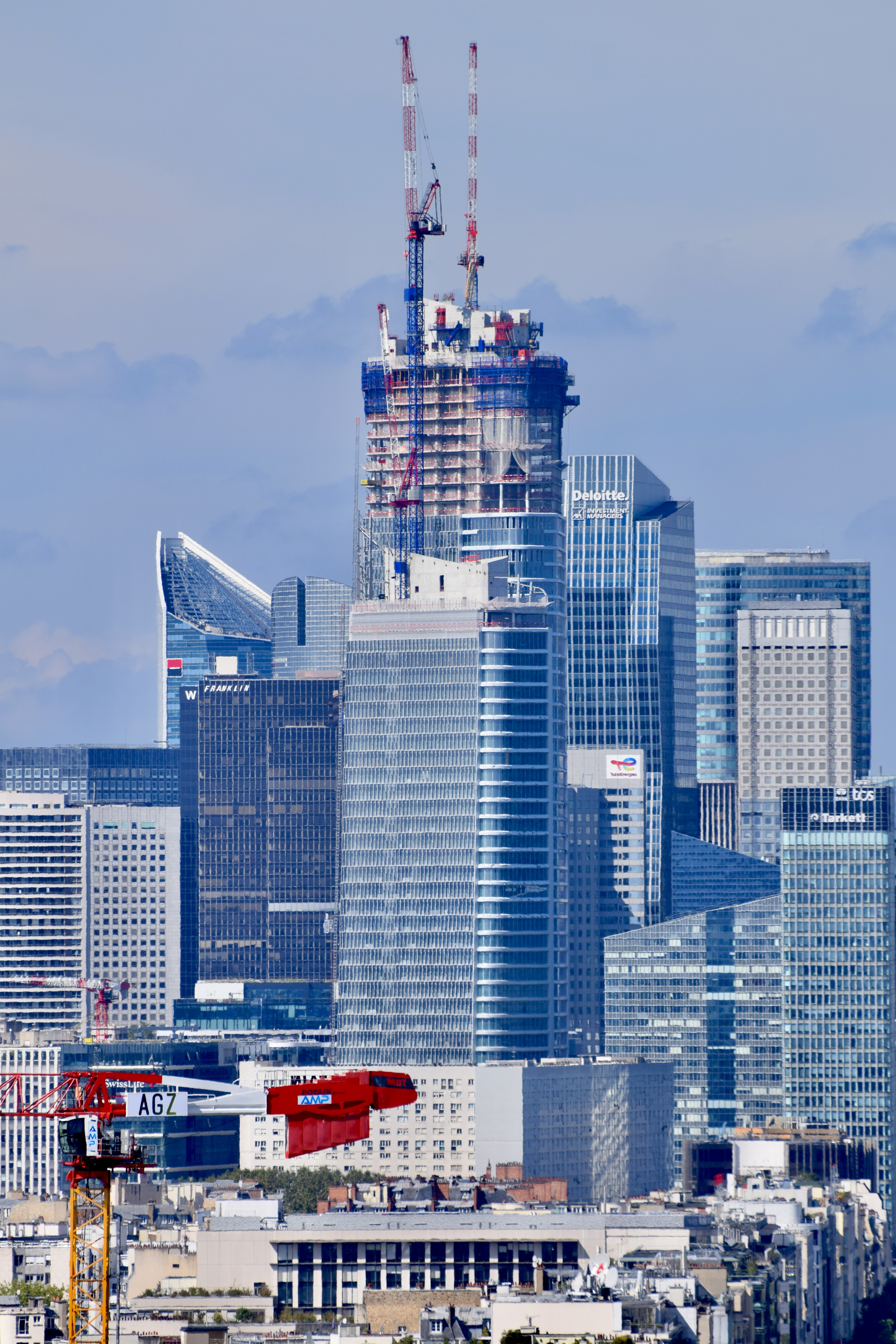
September 2024

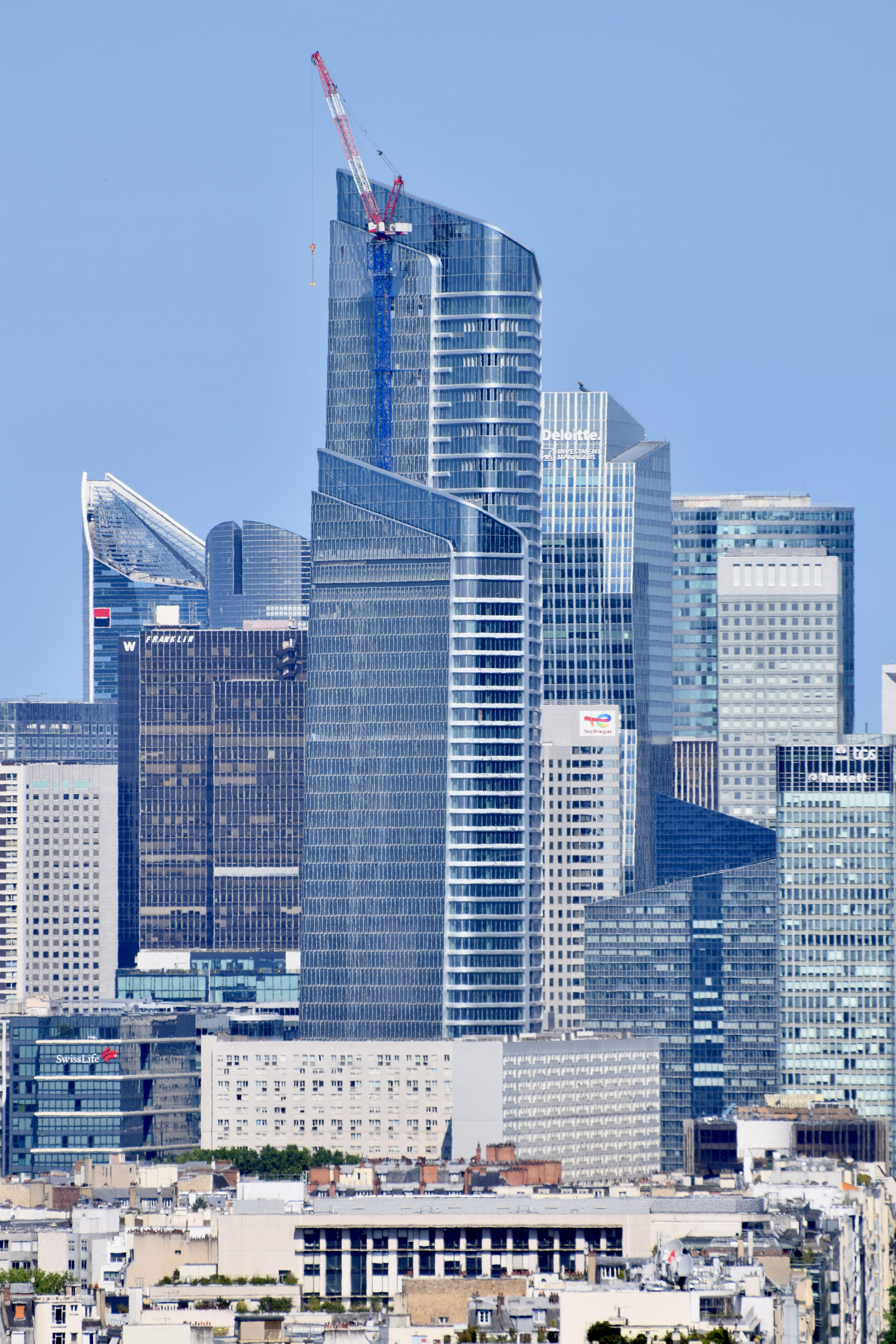
June 2025

August 2026

== See also ==
- List of tallest buildings and structures in the Paris region
- List of tallest buildings in France

Records
| Preceded by Tour First | Tallest building in France; 2025–present 242 metres (794 ft) | Incumbent |
