= Tour Triangle =

Under-construction skyscraper in Paris, France

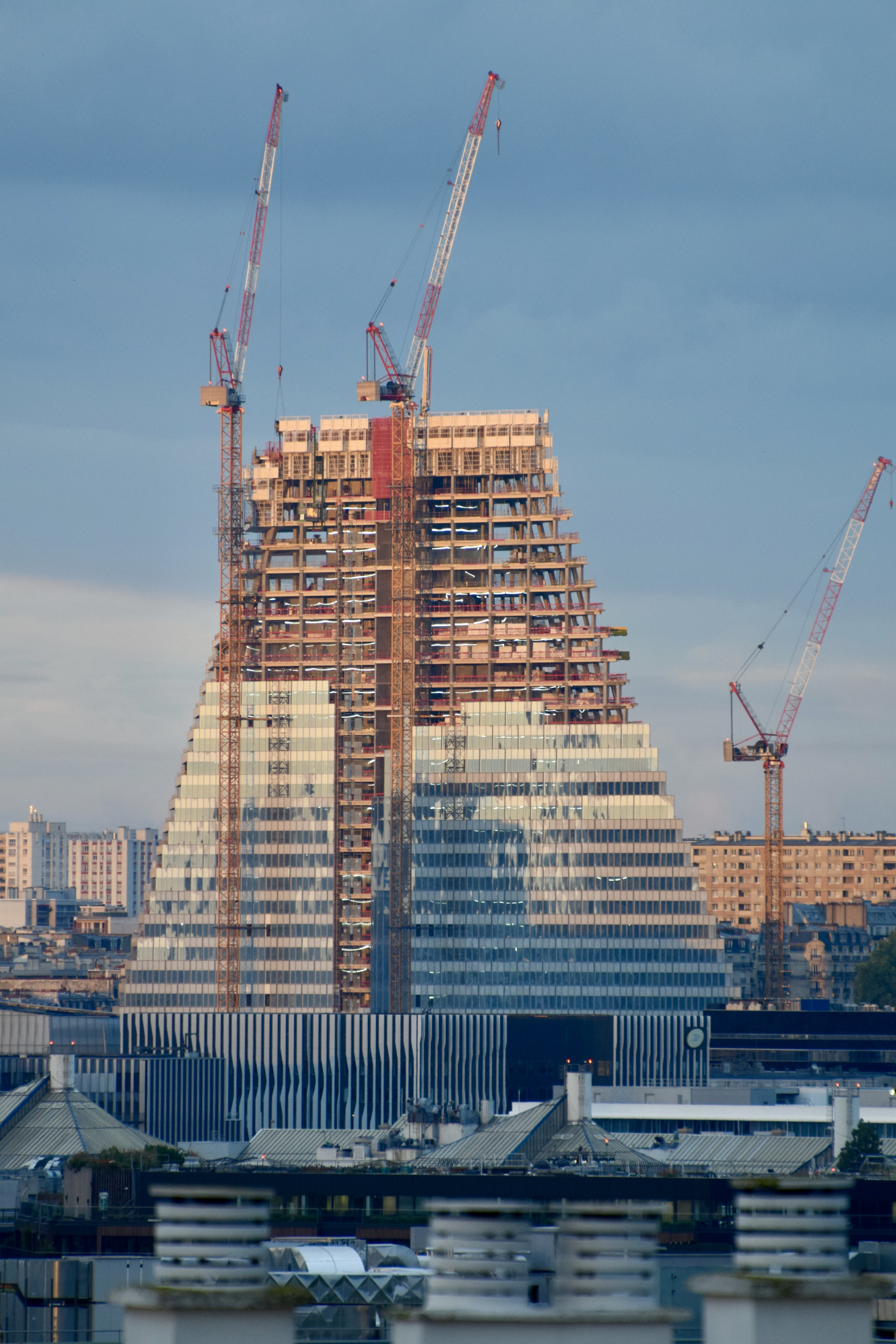
- The tower in July 2025

- Location within Paris

General information
- Status: Under construction
- Type: Mixed-use
- Location: 1 Place de la Porte de Versailles; 75015 Paris
- Coordinates: 48°49′54″N 02°17′09″E
- Groundbreaking: 2008
- Construction started: 2022
- Completed: 2026
- Owner: VIPARIS

Height
- Antenna spire: ~180 m (590 ft)

Technical details
- Floor count: 42

Design and construction
- Architect: Herzog & de Meuron

Website
- tour-triangle.com

The Tour Triangle (French pronunciation: [tuʁ tʁiɑ̃ɡl]; lit. 'Triangle Tower'; also known as the Projet Triangle, or simply Triangle during the planning phase) is an under-construction skyscraper at the Parc des Expositions de la Porte de Versailles in Paris's Rive Gauche, France. Designed by the Swiss firm Herzog & de Meuron, it takes the shape of a 180 m (590 ft) tall glass pyramid with trapezoid base, wide from one side and narrow from another.

== Description ==
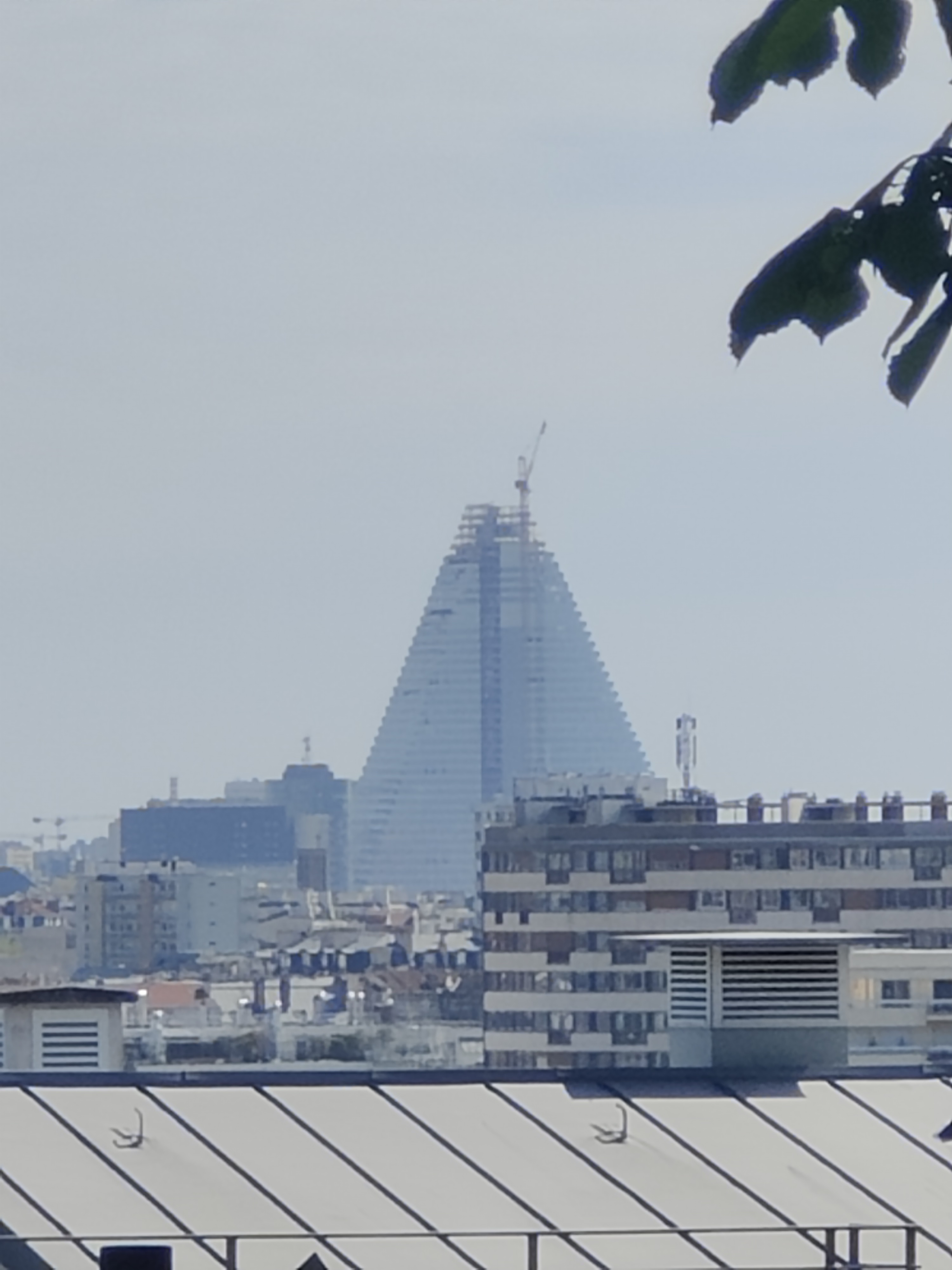
The Tour Triangle seen from Saint-Cloud in April 2026

The Tour Triangle will be a triangle-shaped building that culminates at 180 metres (590 ft).

The Swiss architecture practice Herzog & de Meuron, which had previously designed the 'Bird's Nest' Olympic stadium in Beijing, was chosen to design the project.

In April 2011, VIPARIS, the project owner, was given the green light for Triangle. The tower site is located next to Porte de Versailles in the Parc des Expositions (southwest of Paris).

The plans for the construction of the tower were initially rejected by Paris councillors on 17 November 2014. A second ballot on the matter by the Paris Council on 30 June 2015 approved the building. Critics of the Tour Triangle had opposed the project because of its controversial height. The 42-story project is to be the first skyscraper to be built in low-rise Paris in approximately 40 years since the construction of Tour Montparnasse.

== Architecture ==
Being 42 floors high, it is designed to accommodate about 5,000 employees and host offices, street-level shops, panoramic observatories and a panoramic restaurant on the top floor.

== Sustainability and environmental quality ==
The Tour Triangle is to be a sustainable skyscraper: It was designed to achieve a high energy performance and reach the HQE and BREEAM certifications. It would favor natural light, and generate one-fourth the CO_{2} of a standard building of its size.
