= Tour Montparnasse =

Office skyscraper in Paris, France

Tour Maine-Montparnasse

- Tour Montparnasse in June 2010
- Interactive map of the Tour Maine-Montparnasse area

General information
- Type: Commercial offices
- Location: 33 Avenue du Maine; 15th arrondissement Paris, France
- Coordinates: 48.8421°N 2.3220°E
- Construction started: 1969
- Completed: 1973

Height
- Roof: 210 m (690 ft)

Technical details
- Floor count: 60
- Floor area: 88,400 m^{2} (952,000 sq ft)

Design and construction
- Architects: Cabinet Saubot-Jullien; Eugène Élie Beaudouin; Louis-Gabriel de Hoÿm de Marien; Urbain Cassan; A. Epstein and Sons International
- Developer: Wylie Tuttle

Website
- tourmontparnasse56.com

Tour Maine-Montparnasse (Maine-Montparnasse Tower), also commonly named Tour Montparnasse, is a 210-metre (689 ft) office skyscraper in the Montparnasse area of Paris, France. Constructed from 1969 to 1973, it was the tallest skyscraper in France until 2011, when it was surpassed by the 231-metre (758 ft) Tour First in the La Défense business district west of Paris's city limits. It remains the tallest building in Paris proper and the fourth tallest in France, behind the Link, Tour First and Tour Hekla. As of February 2026, it is the 59th-tallest building in Europe.

The tower was designed by architects Eugène Beaudouin, Urbain Cassan, and Louis de Hoÿm de Marien and built by Campenon Bernard. On 21 September 2017, Nouvelle AOM won a competition to redesign the building's façade. The commercial center portion will be redesigned by Renzo Piano.

== Description ==
The building has 59 floors and is built on top of the Montparnasse–Bienvenüe station of the Paris Métro.

There is an observation deck, branded as Paris Montparnasse, located on the 56th floor, 200 m (660 ft) above the ground. The same floor hosts a restaurant called Ciel de Paris, 'Sky of Paris'. There is also a rooftop terrace. On a clear day, the view from the observation deck extends for 40 km (25 mi); aircraft can be seen taking off from Orly Airport. The guard rail, to which various antennae are attached, can be pneumatically lowered.

The design of the tower predates architectural trends of more modern skyscrapers today that are often designed to provide a window for every office. Only the offices around the perimeter of each floor of Tour Montparnasse have windows.

== History ==
=== The project ===
In 1934, the old Montparnasse station located on the edges of the similarly named boulevard, opposite the Rue de Rennes, appeared ill-suited to traffic. The city of Paris planned to reorganise the district and build a new station. But the project, entrusted to Raoul Dautry (who would give his name to the square of the tower), met strong opposition and was cancelled.

In 1956, on the occasion of the adoption of the new master plan for the Paris traffic plan, the Société d'économie mixte pour l'Aménagement du secteur Maine Montparnasse (SEMMAM) was created, as well as the l'Agence pour l'Opération Maine Montparnasse (AOM). Their mission was to redevelop the neighbourhood, which required razing many streets, often dilapidated and unsanitary. The site then occupied up to 8 hectares (20 acres).

In 1958, the first studies of the tower were well launched, but the project was strongly criticised because of the height of the building. A controversy ensued, led by the Minister of Public Works Edgard Pisani, who obtained the support of André Malraux, then Minister of Culture under General de Gaulle which led to slowdowns in the project.

However, the reconstruction of the Montparnasse station a few hundred metres south of the old one and the destruction of the Gare du Maine, which was included in the real estate project of the AOM, a joint agency which brought together the four architects: Urbain Cassan, Eugène Beaudouin and Louis de Hoÿm de Marien, was carried out from June 1966 to the spring of 1969 with the assistance of the architect Jean Saubot.

In 1968, André Malraux granted the building permit for the Tower to the AOM and work began that same year. The project was spearheaded by the American real estate developer Wylie Tuttle, who enlisted a consortium of 17 French insurance companies and seven banks in the $140 million multiple-building project, but later distanced himself from the project until his 2002 obituary revealed that the building was his original "brainchild".

In 1969, the decision to build a shopping centre was finally made, and Georges Pompidou, then President of the Republic, wanted to provide the capital with modern infrastructure. Despite a major controversy, the construction of the tower was started.

For geographer Anne Clerval, this construction symbolises the service economy of Paris in the 1970s resulting from deindustrialisation policies which, from the 1960s, favoured "bypassing by space the most working class strongholds at the time".

=== Construction ===
The Tour Montparnasse in comparison to other tall structures in Paris

The Tour Montparnasse was built between 1969 and 1973 on the site of the old Montparnasse station. The first stone was laid in 1970 and the inauguration took place in 1973.

The foundations of the tower are made up of 56 reinforced concrete pillars sinking 70 m (230 ft) underground. For urban planning reasons, the tower had to be built just above a Metro line; and to avoid using the same support and weakening it, the Metro structures were protected by a reinforced concrete shield. Long horizontal beams were installed in order to free up the space needed in the basement to fit out the tracks for trains.

== Occupation ==
The tower is mainly occupied by offices. Various companies and organisations have settled in the tower:

- The International Union of Architects, Axa and MMA insurers, the mining and metallurgy company Eramet, Al Jazeera
- Political parties have used campaign offices, such as François Mitterrand in 1974, the RPR in the late 1970s, Emmanuel Macron's La République En Marche! in 2016, Benoît Hamon since 2018
- Previously Tour Maine-Montparnasse housed the executive management of Accor.

The 56th floor, with its terrace, bars and restaurant, has been used for private or public events. During the 1980s and 1990s, the live National Lottery was cast on TF1 from the 56th floor.

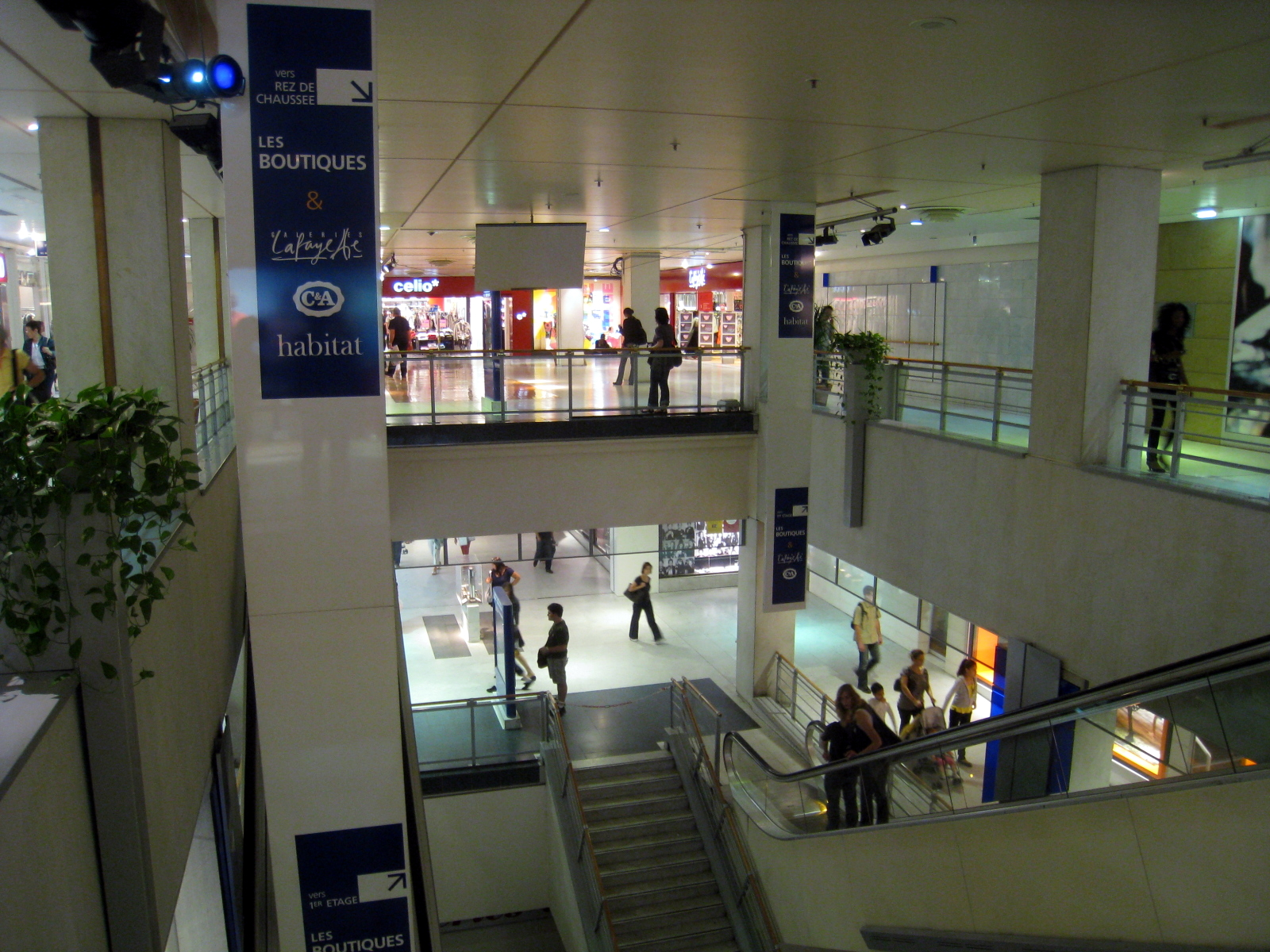
Shopping Arcade of Tour Montparnasse

Office reception hall of Tour Montparnasse

== Climbing the tower ==
French urban climber Alain Robert scaled the building's exterior glass and steel wall to the top twice, in 1995 and in 2015, both times using no equipment or safety devices. The feat was also undertaken by Polish climber Marcin Banot in 2020 and 2023.

== Criticism ==
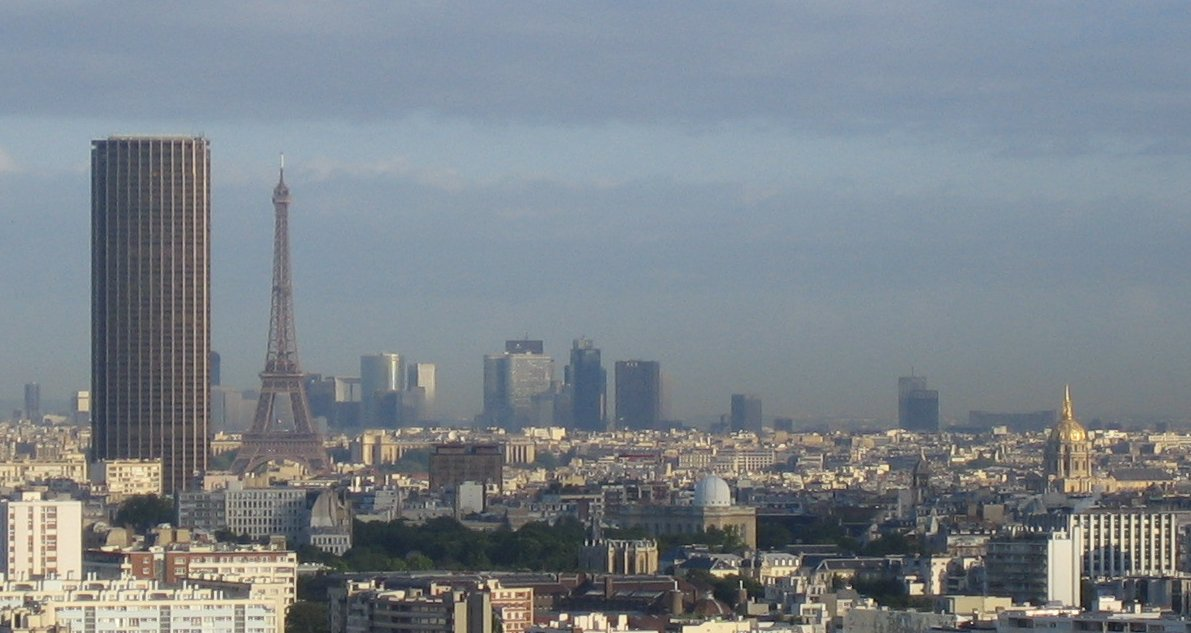
Tour Montparnasse next to the Eiffel Tower

The tower's simple architecture, large proportions and monolithic appearance have been often criticised by Parisians for being out of place in Paris's cityscape. As a result, two years after its completion the construction of buildings over seven storeys tall in the city centre was banned in Paris. This ban was lifted in 2015, though it was reinstated since 2023 following the construction of Tour Triangle.

It is said as a joke among Parisians that the tower's observation deck enjoys a beautiful view of Paris because it is the only place from which the tower cannot be seen.

A 2008 poll of editors on Virtualtourist voted the building the second-ugliest building in the world, behind Boston City Hall in the United States.

== Asbestos contamination ==
In 2005, studies showed that the tower contained asbestos material. When inhaled, for instance during repairs, asbestos is a carcinogen. Monitoring revealed that legal limits of fibres per litre were surpassed and, on at least one occasion, reached 20 times the legal limit. Due to health and legal concerns, some tenants abandoned their offices in the building.

Removal of the asbestos was originally expected to take three years. After a nearly three-year delay, removal began in 2009 alongside regular operation of the building. In 2012, it was reported the tower was 90% free of asbestos.

== See also ==
- List of tallest buildings and structures in the Paris region
- List of tallest buildings in France

Records
Preceded by Tour Les Poissons	Tallest building in France; 1972–2011; 210 metres (690 ft)	Succeeded by Tour First
