= Raymond E. Joslin =

American businessman (1936–2013)

Raymond E. Joslin (November 21, 1936 – August 2, 2013) was an American businessman and cable executive. Joslin served as Group Head of Hearst Entertainment & Syndication of The Hearst Corporation since 1989 and served as its President. He served as Senior Vice President of The Hearst Corporation. He was the CEO of CAD Sciences LLC. Joslin attended Trinity College and is a member of the Cable Hall of Fame.
