= Place Farhat-Hached =

Square in Paris, France

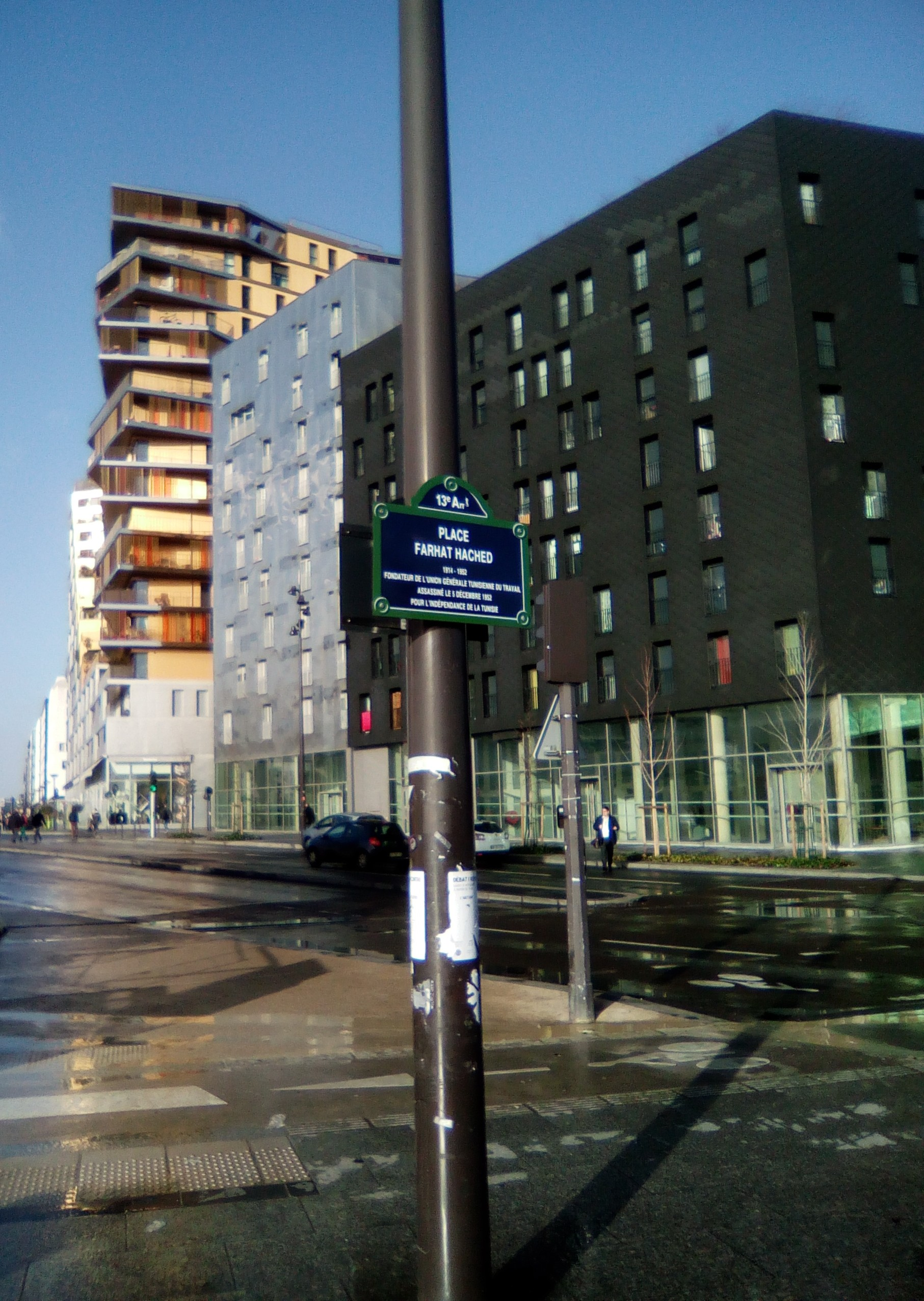
- Place Farhat-Hached at the start of the Avenue de France

- Location within Paris
- Length: 60 m (200 ft)
- Width: 20 m (66 ft)
- Arrondissement: 13th
- Quarter: Gare
- Coordinates: 48°49′34″N 2°22′52″E
- From: 32, Boulevard du Général-d'Armée-Jean-Simon
- To: Avenue de France

Construction
- Inauguration: April 30, 2013

The Place Farhat-Hached is a square in the 13th arrondissement of Paris, France.

== Location ==
The Place Farhat-Hached is a triangular square that connects the Boulevard du Général-d'Armée-Jean-Simon (No. 32) with the Avenue de France. It is situated near the Avenue de France stop of tramway Line 3a. It is also served by the Métro Line 14 (Bibliothèque François Mitterrand station) and the RER C (Bibliothèque François-Mitterrand station), as well as RATP bus lines 62, 89, 118, 132, 325.

Porte de France is located on Place Farhat-Hached.

== History ==
The square was named after Tunisian trade unionist Farhat Hached (1914-1952), who was assassinated by the SDECE (France's then external intelligence agency). For a long time, his death was attributed to La Main Rouge, an armed group that supported French presence in Tunisia.

Formerly named "voie EW/13", the square was part of the Paris Rive Gauche arrangement plan. The square was inaugurated under its current name on April 30, 2013.

== Art ==
Les Rochers dans le ciel ("The rocks in the sky"), an artwork designed by Didier Marcel, is installed on the square. It features five imitations of rough limestone rocks on the top of five poles.

A portrait of Farhat Hached was painted by Mehdi Bouanani (aka DaBro) on the façade of a building near the square in the 13th arrondissement.
