= Hotel Barrière Le Majestic Cannes =

Hotel in Cannes, France

Coordinates: 43°33′4.3″N 7°1′11.7″E

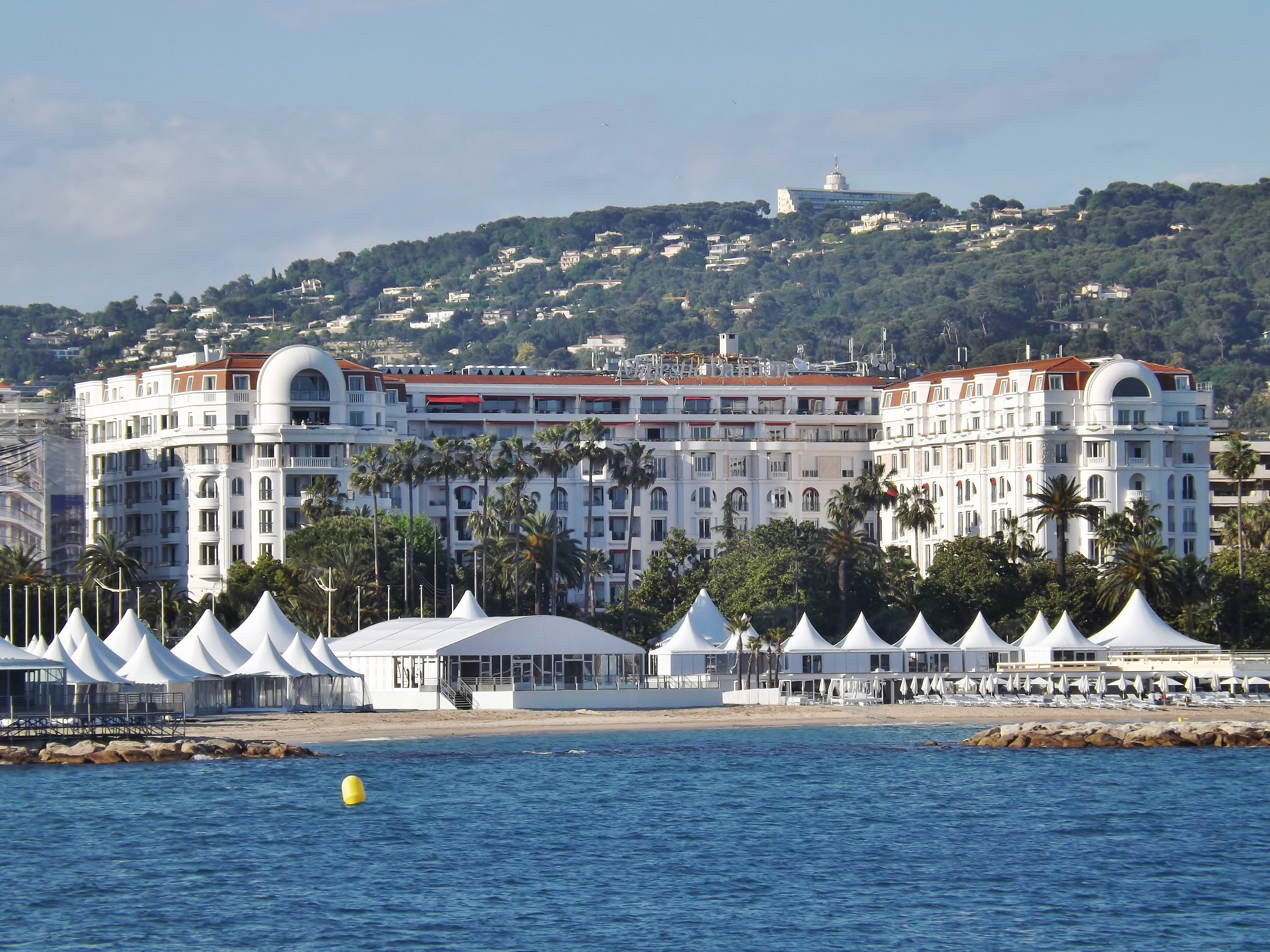
Hotel Barrière Le Majestic Cannes

The Hotel Barrière Le Majestic Cannes is a historic luxury hotel on the Croisette in Cannes, built in 1926. It belongs to the Lucien Barrière group. It is a traditional hotel for film stars attending the Cannes Festival.

== History ==
The present hotel is the result of the merger of the parcels of the former hôtel Beau-Rivage and of two neighbouring villas. Construction began in 1923 under the leadership of architect Théo Petit, also architect of the hôtel Normandy at Deauville. He produced an art deco design with a main façade and 2 rear wings, but only the east wing and the main body were finished when the hotel opened in 1926. The rest of the central body of the building was extended in 1928 by the architects Charles Nicod and Émile Molinié, at which date the interiors were also redecorated by Maurice Debenedetti. 2 floors were added to the top of the building in 1965 and in 1990 the façades were rebuilt uniformly in their original art deco style.

== Location ==
Hotel Barrière Le Majestic Cannes is located in the centre of the town of Cannes on the Croisette at 25 km from the aéroport de Nice via the road along the seaside, 1 km (5 mn) from the gare de Cannes, and faces the palais des Festivals on the Croisette. Hotel Barrière Le Majestic Cannes is located 8 km from Antibes, 30 km from Saint-Paul de Vence, 50 km from Monaco and 50 km from Saint-Tropez. Its prestigious neighbors on the Croisette are the InterContinental Carlton Cannes Hotel, the Grand Hyatt Cannes Hôtel Martinez, the JW Marriott Cannes and the palais des Festivals.

== Characteristics ==
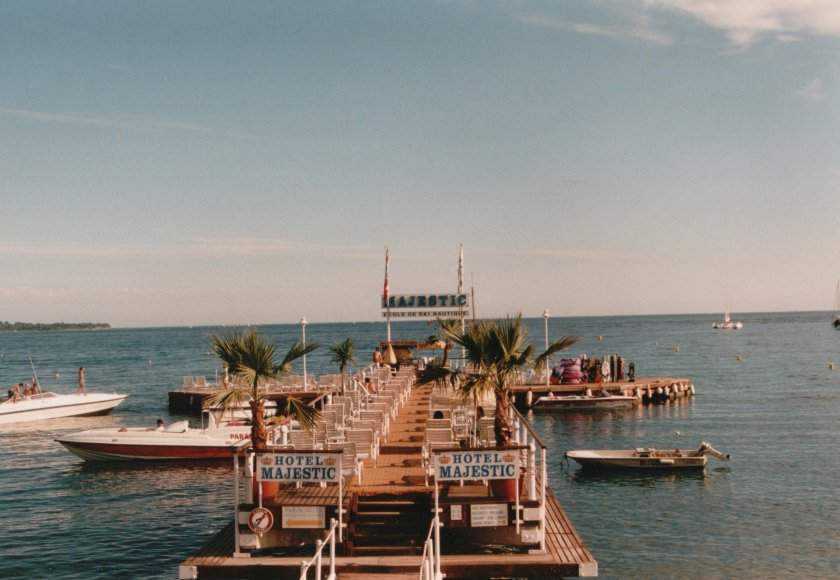
the Majestic's pier for watersports activities

- The hotel belongs to the Groupe Lucien Barrière whose president is Dominique Desseigne
- 17 representative halls for conferences, receptions, cocktail and festive events
- Three restaurants, one of them is the Restaurant de la Plage; another, the La Villa des Lys with chef Bruno Oger who received two Guide Michelin stars in 2005
- Pianobar Bar du Fouquet's and a luxurious brasserie: Fouquet's Cannes
- 305 rooms, 23 of which are suites with a balcony and mostly with a view of the Mediterranean.
- Sauna, hamam, jacuzzi, child care, shops, fitness studio, travel agency, car and limo rental office, beauty parlour, laundry, currency exchange, concierge and page boy, safe.
- Outside heated swimming pool.
- Private sandy beach, watersports (waterski, kitesurfing, windsurfing, strolls along the coastline ...
- Casino Barrière de Cannes Croisette with 290 gambling machines.
- The hotel lobby telephones use a ringtone that plays the main theme from Jacques Offenbach's The Tales of Hoffmann.
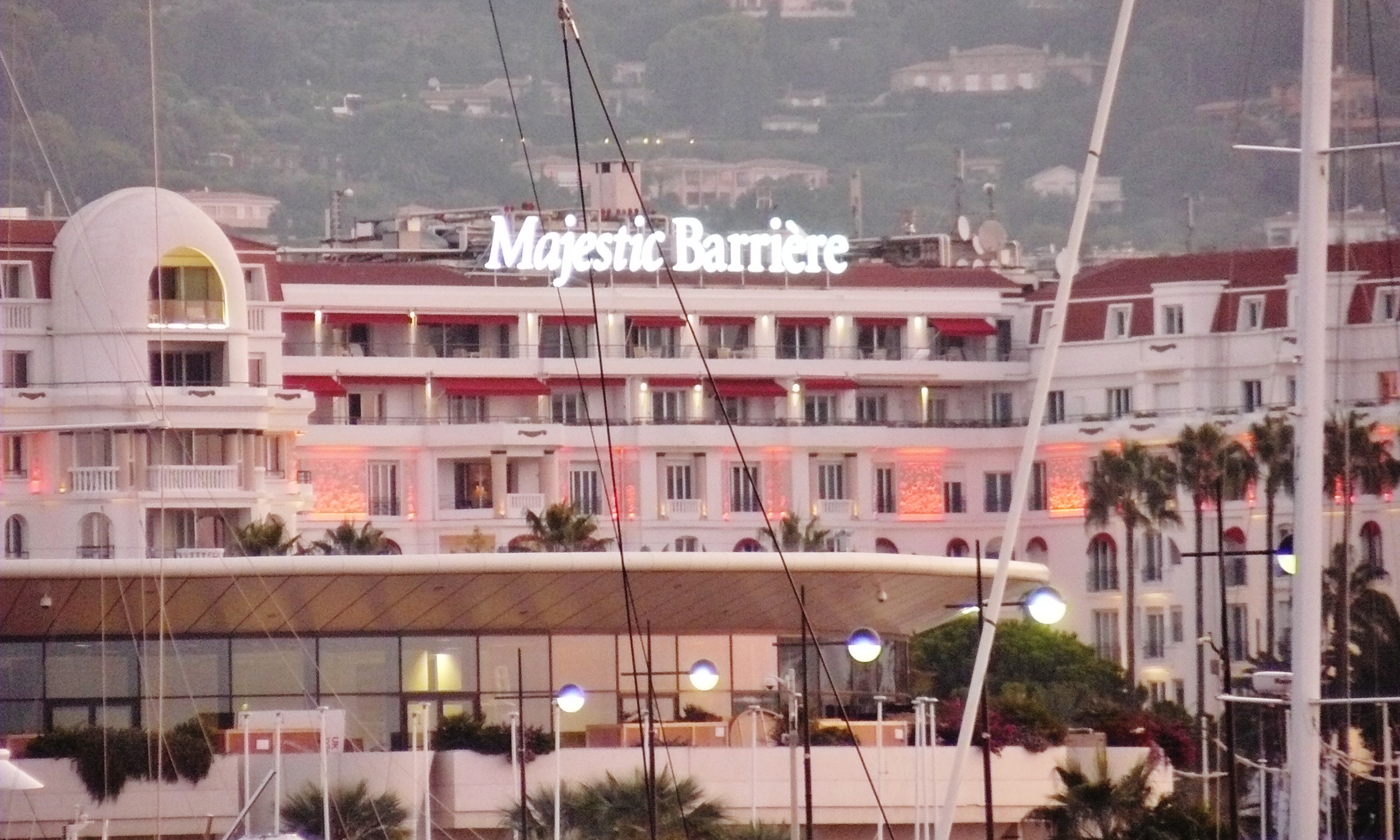

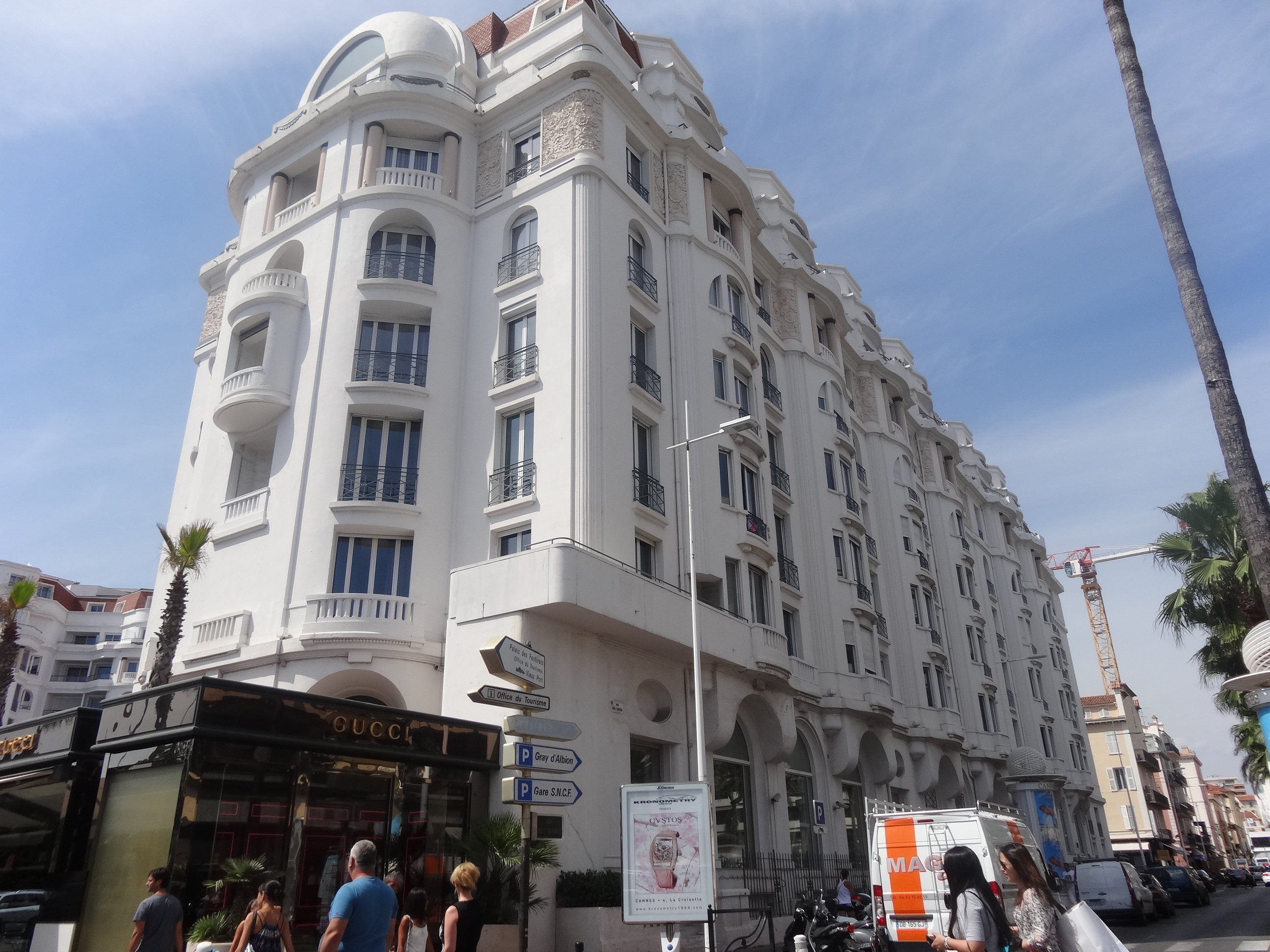

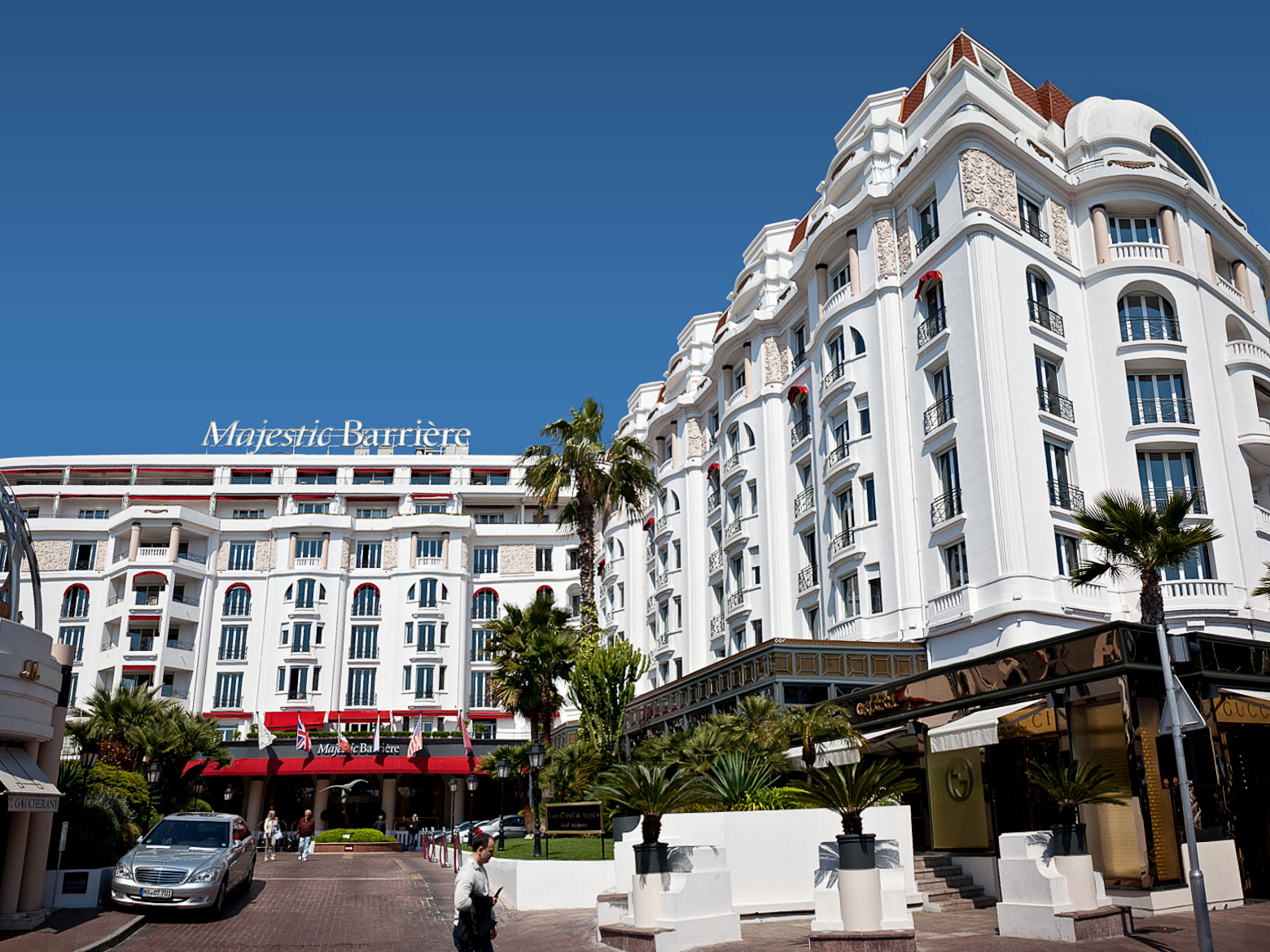

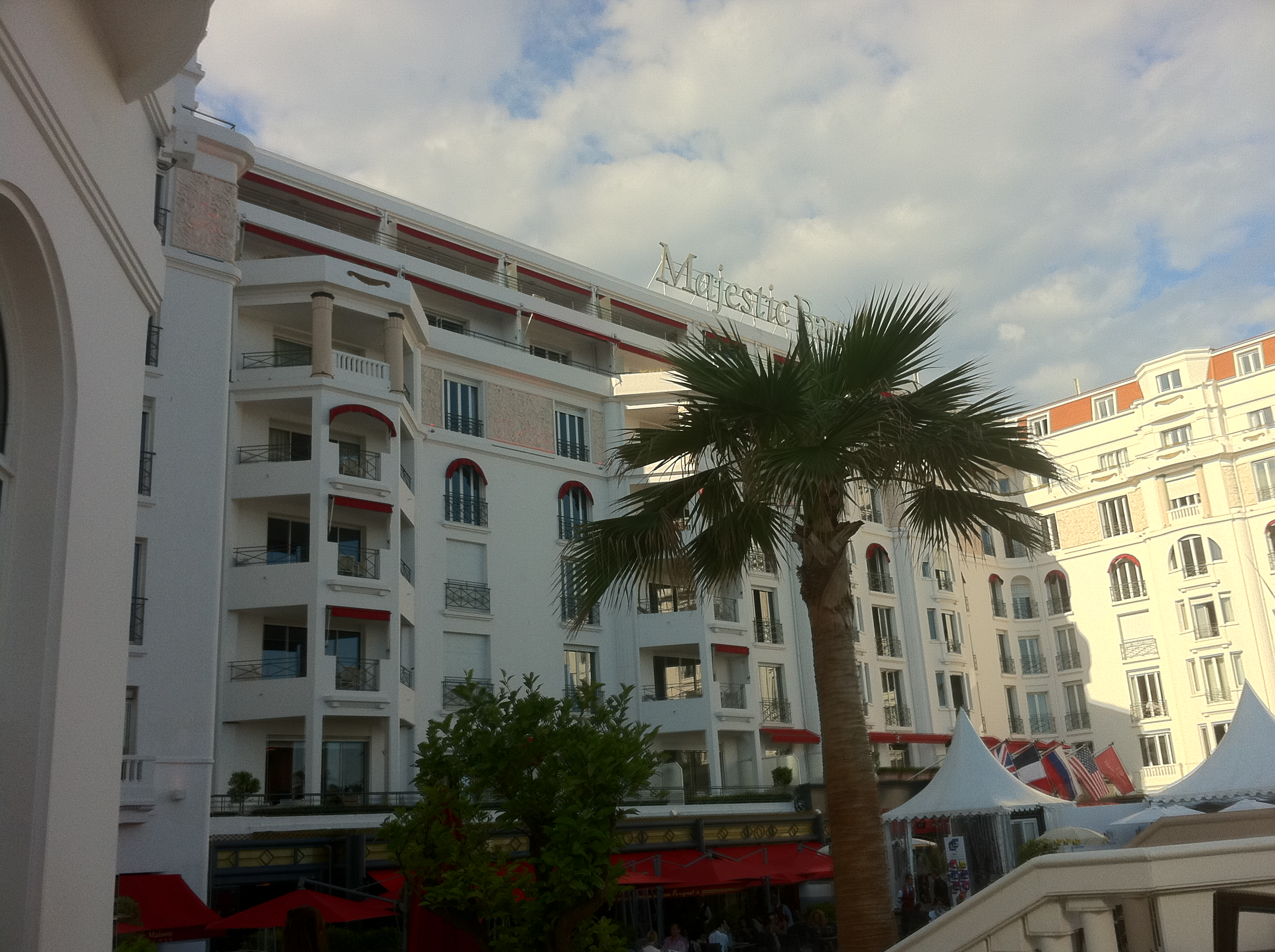

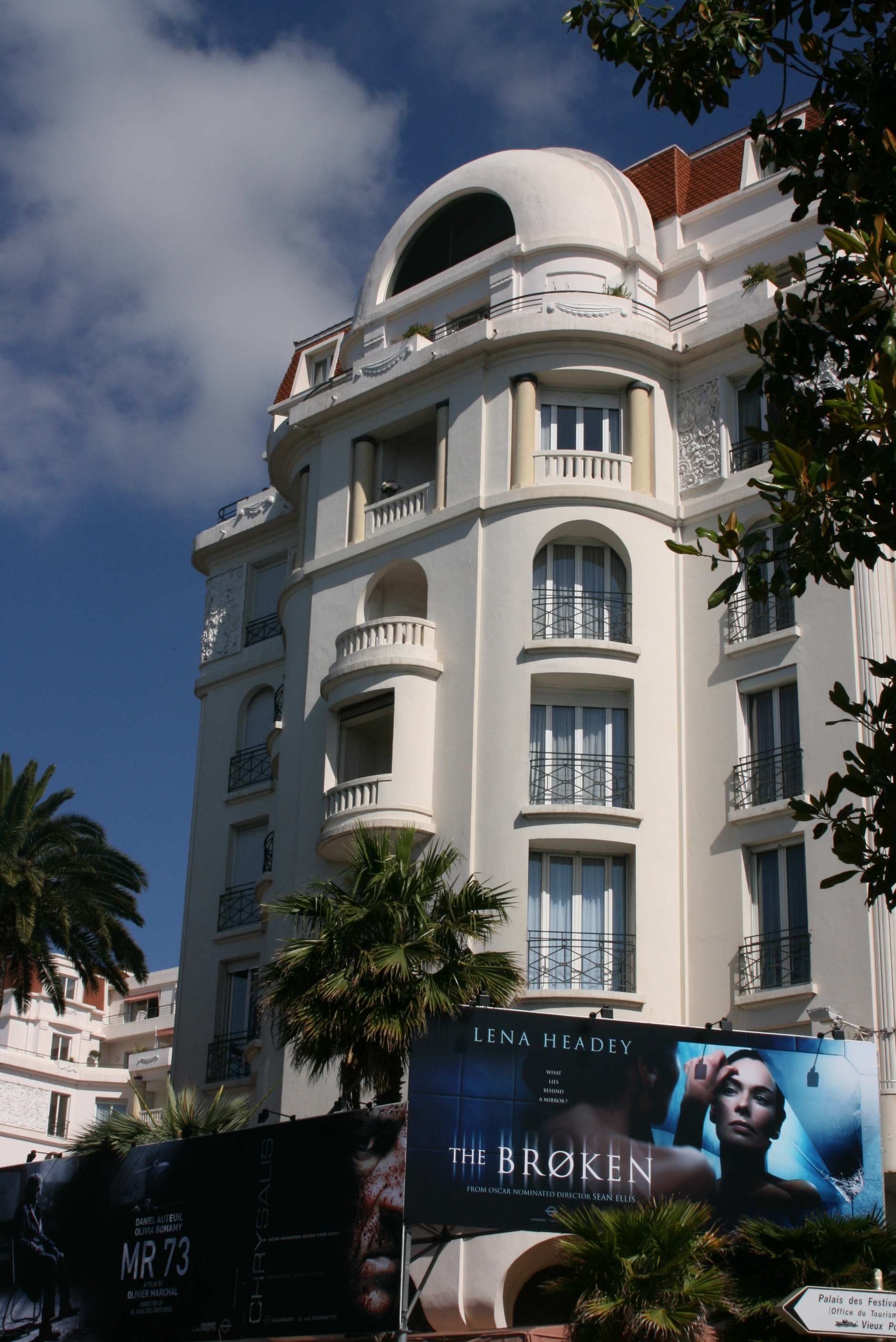

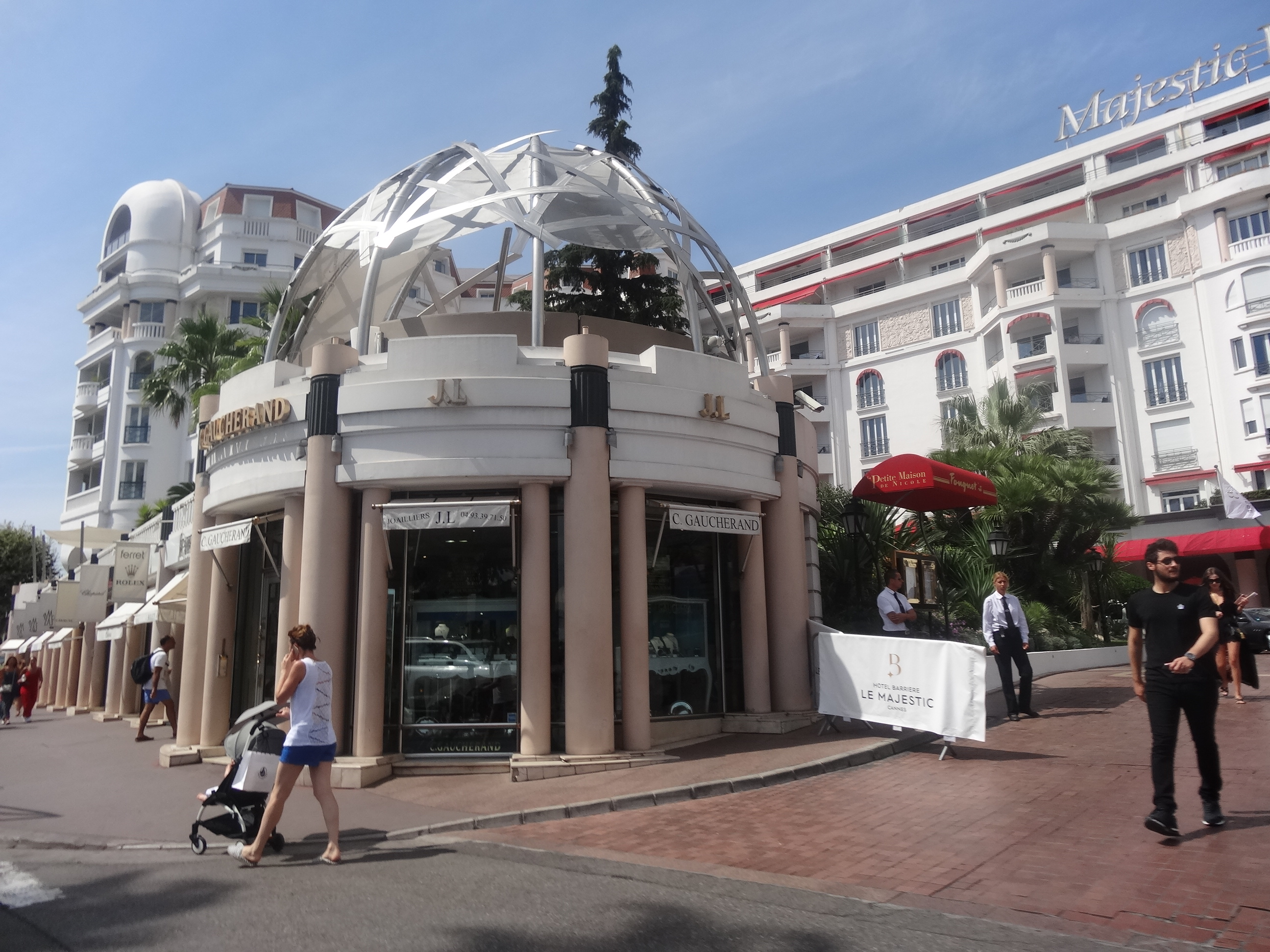
