= Hôtel Barrière Le Fouquet's =

Hotel in Paris, France

Hôtel Barrière Le Fouquet's Paris

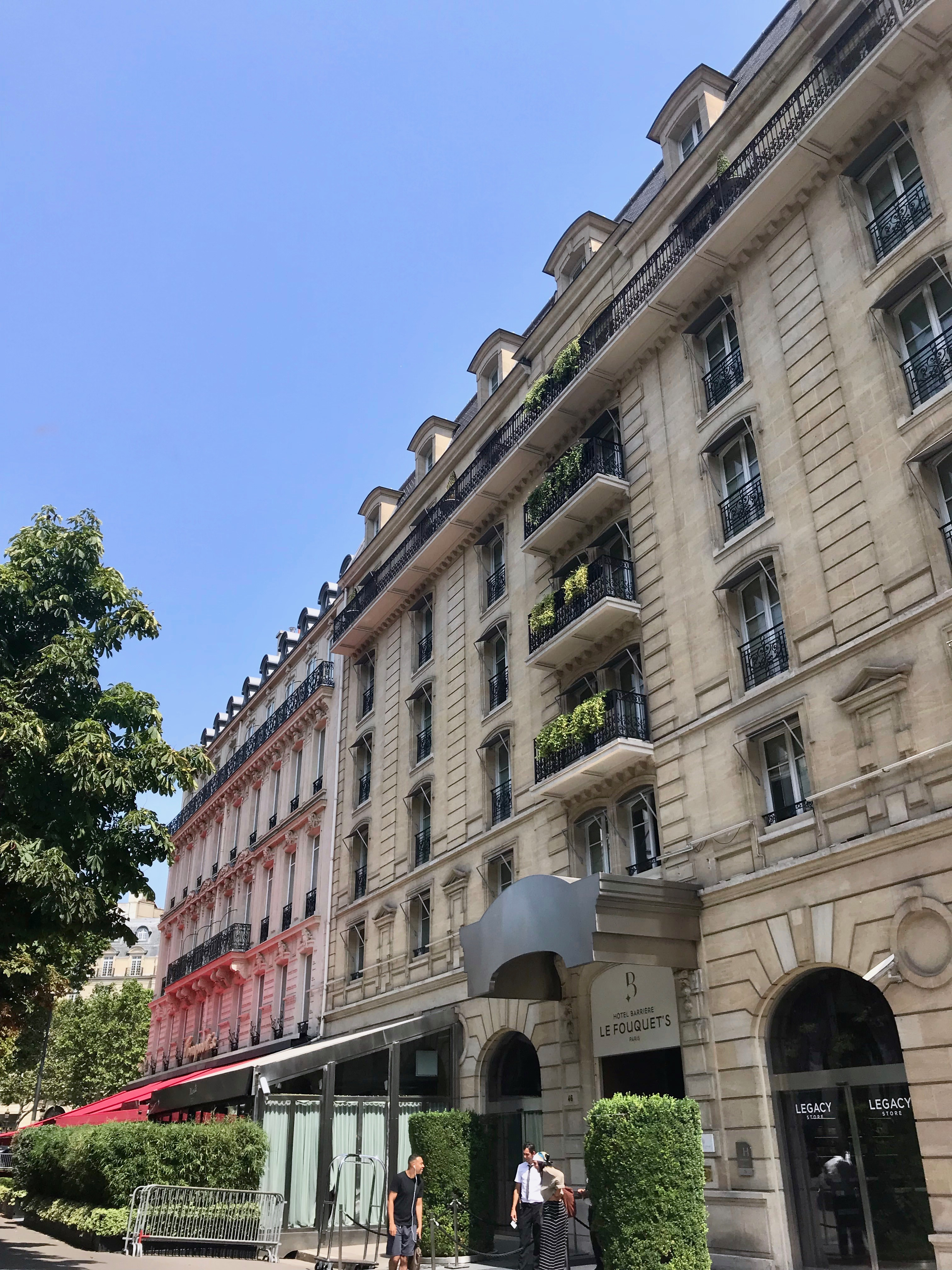

- Location within Paris
- Former names: Hôtel Fouquet's Barrière

General information
- Type: Hotel
- Architectural style: Haussmannian
- Location: 46 Avenue George V, Paris, France
- Coordinates: 48°52′17″N 2°18′5″E
- Opened: 6 November 2006
- Inaugurated: 25 October 2006
- Renovated: 2017
- Owner: Groupe Lucien Barrière

Design and construction
- Architect: Édouard François
- Other designers: Jacques Garcia

Website
- Official website

Hôtel Barrière Le Fouquet's Paris is a 5-star hotel located at 46 Avenue George V in Paris, France. The hotel, owned by the French hospitality and casino group Barrière, opened on 6 November 2006 and is a member of The Leading Hotels of the World.

The restaurant Fouquet's, known for its red awnings on the Champs-Élysées, is part of the venue. The hotel received its fifth star on 11 June 2009, and won the category of "Europe's Leading City Hotel" at the World Travel Awards in 2013. It was named a Palace hotel in June 2026.

== History ==
In the 1990s, the Barrière family purchased the restaurant Fouquet's, along with seven buildings surrounding the venue, in the hope of opening the group's first hotel in the French capital. Opened in 2006, the hotel was developed with the collaboration of French architect Édouard François and designer Jacques Garcia.

The hotel was closed in early 2017 to allow for renovations, and reopened on 1 July that year.

== Restaurants and bars ==
The venue includes 2 restaurants and 3 bars:

- Fouquet's restaurant, located at 99 Avenue des Champs-Élysées
- Le Joy restaurant, located at 46 Avenue George V, opening onto the inner garden of the hotel
- L'Escadrille bar
- Le Marta bar, which also extends on a rooftop during summertime
- Le Joy bar

== Literature ==
An earlier restaurant of the establishment, which was called "The Diana" in tribute to Lucien Barrière's adopted daughter Diane Barrière-Desseigne, is mentioned in J.P. Thiollet's 2016 novel Hallier, L'Edernel jeune homme (Hallier, the Edernal Young Man).
