= 1975 Deauville American Film Festival =

- Festival poster
- Location: Deauville, France
- Hosted by: Deauville American Film Festival Group
- No. of films: 12 feature films
- Festival date: September 3, 1975–September 7, 1975
- Language: International
- Website: www.festival-deauville.com

The 1st Deauville American Film Festival took place at Deauville, France from September 3 to 7, 1975. It was created by French writer Lionel Chouchan and French journalist and television producer André Halimi, which they described as "(to) show films that only a few privileged - amazed or astonished – people had discovered, in New York or Los Angeles, to French audiences, without exclusion, barriers or bias". It occurs every year since its creation at the end of the summer. They received funding from French entrepreneur and businessman Lucien Barrière's group and mayor of Deauville at that time, Michel d'Ornano.

The festival was non-competitive in nature and remained so until 1995. It screened 12 feature films at three different sites, International Centre (1,500 seats), the Casino (700 vehicles) and the Cinéma Morny (two rooms of 271 and 99 seats). Initially the festival was attended by locals but with passing years its popularity increased and attracted international attention. The festival also highlighted the best of American cinematography.

== Programme ==
=== Feature films ===
- A Boy and His Dog by L.Q. Jones
- Caged Heat by Jonathan Demme
- Emil and the Piglet by Olle Hellbom
- Janis by Howard Alk
- Jonathan Livingston Seagull by Hall Bartlett
- The Great Waldo Pepper by George Roy Hill
- The Reincarnation of Peter Proud by J. Lee Thompson
- Lifespan by Sandy Whitelaw
- Love and Death by Woody Allen
- Nashville by Robert Altman
- Open Season by Peter Collinson
- Supervixens by Russ Meyer
