= Boulevard du Général-d'Armée-Jean-Simon =

Street in Paris, France

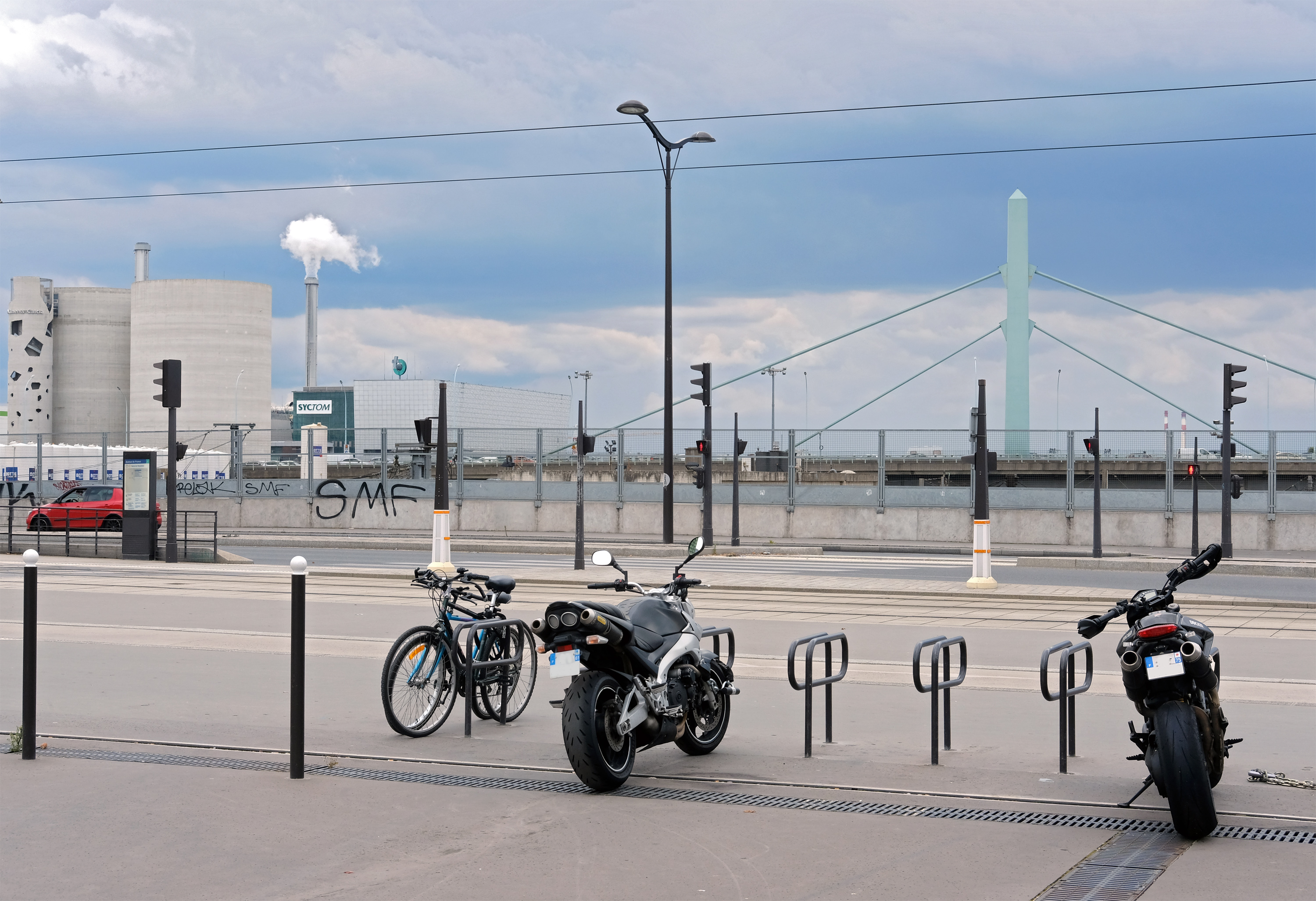
- The Boulevard du Général-d'Armée-Jean-Simon. Looking toward the Boulevard Périphérique.

- Location within Paris
- Arrondissement: 13th
- Quarter: Quartier de la Gare
- Coordinates: 48°49′32″N 2°22′54″E
- From: 27, Quai d'Ivry; 1, Quai Panhard-et-Levassor
- To: Porte de Vitry

Construction
- Denomination: September 25, 2013

The Boulevard du Général-d'Armée-Jean-Simon (French pronunciation: [bulvaʁ dy ʒeneʁal daʁme ʒɑ̃ simɔ̃]) is a boulevard in the 13th arrondissement of Paris, France. It is one of the Boulevards of the Marshals, which run in the outer parts of the city.

== Route ==
The boulevard continues the route of Boulevard Masséna from Porte de Vitry (southwestern terminus) to Porte de la Gare at the intersection of Quais Panhard-et-Levassor and d'Ivry (northeastern end). It forms a viaduct that crosses the tracks of the Austerlitz train station and overlooks the southern part of the Paris Rive Gauche neighborhood. It is continued by the Pont National, which crosses the Seine river and connects to Boulevard Poniatowski.

The boulevard is served by the stations Maryse Bastié et Avenue de France of the tramway Line T3a.

== History ==
As the former "CA/13 way", the boulevard was named after General Jules Simon (1814–1896), an officer of the Ground Army and the French Foreign Legion and a member of the Free French Forces, and was inaugurated as such on September 25, 2013. The boulevard was part of the arrangement plan of Paris Rive Gauche.

== Important buildings ==
At No. 36 stands the M6B2 tower, also called "Biodiversity Tower", a vegetated high-rise with public housings. It was designed by Édouard François and built in 2015 for Paris Habitat.
