= Fouquet's =

Restaurant in Paris

Coordinates: 48.8714°N 2.3013°E

Fouquet's Paris
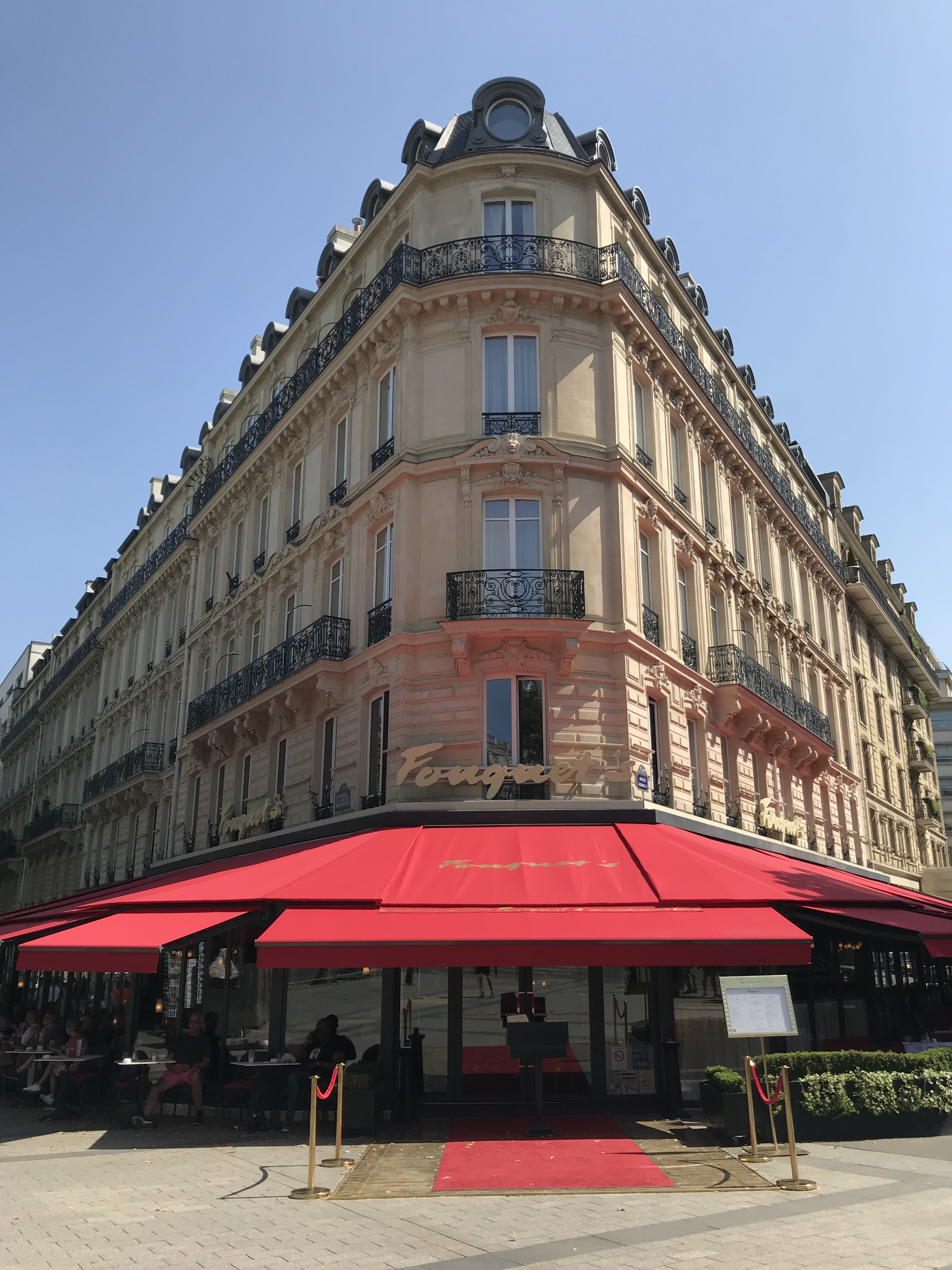
- Fouquet's Paris - exterior view
- Interactive map of Fouquet's Paris
- Location: 99 avenue des Champs-Elysées, Paris, France
- Designer: Jacques Garcia
- Opening date: 1899; 127 years ago
- Restored date: 2019; 7 years ago
- Website: https://www.hotelsbarriere.com/en/paris/le-fouquets/restaurants-and-bars/fouquets.html

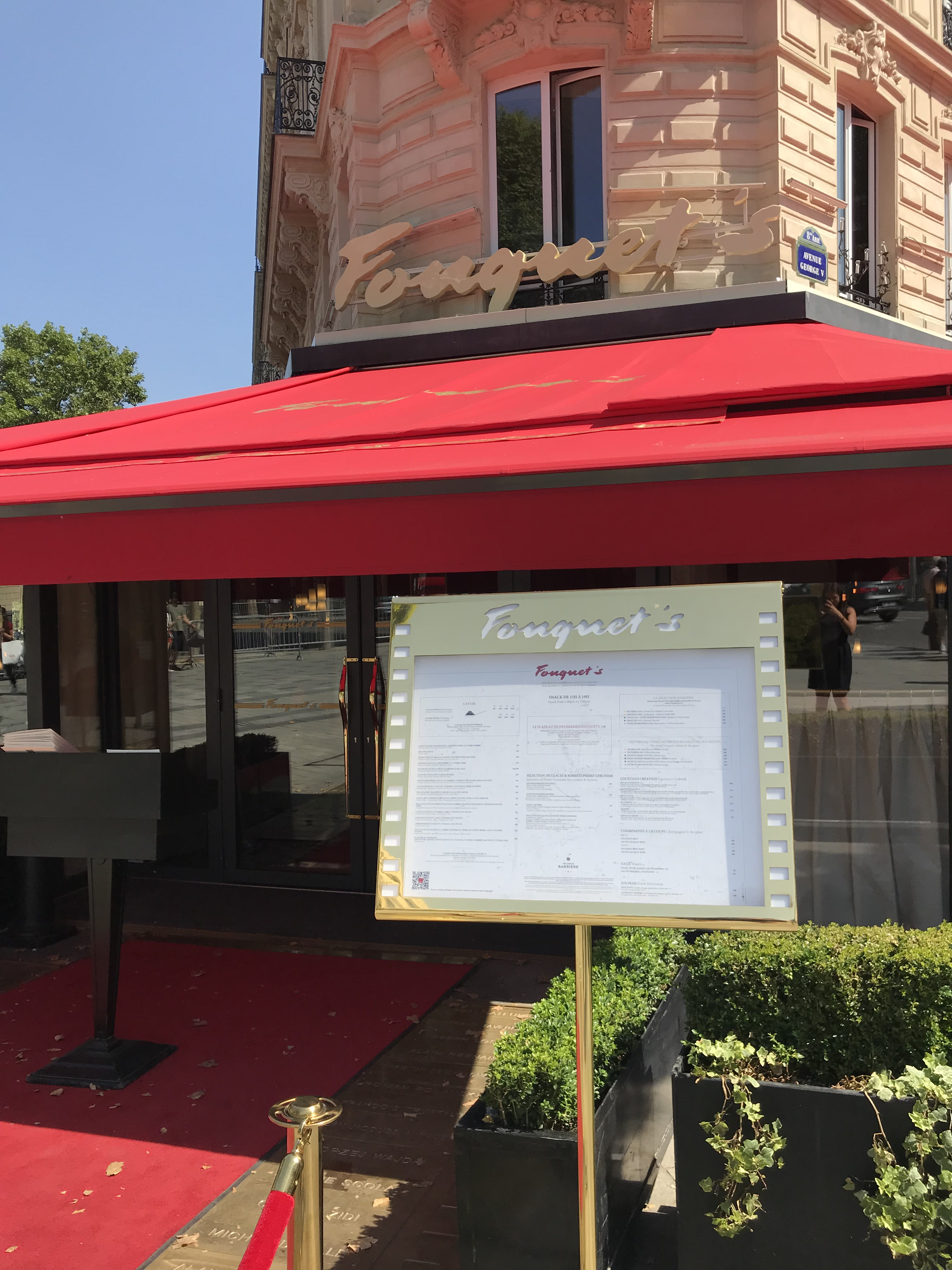
Fouquet's exterior view

Fouquet's Paris is an historic brasserie restaurant in Paris, France located at 99 Avenue des Champs-Élysées. Part of Hotel Barrière Le Fouquet's Paris, the site is known for its red awnings spread over two terraces on the Champs-Élysées and Avenue George V.

For decades, Fouquet's Paris has been a place where people from the entertainment industry would meet. It has strong ties with the cinema, and hosts every year the traditional dinner after the César Awards.

== History ==
Fouquet's brasserie was founded in 1899 by Louis Fouquet. The restaurant has been listed as a historical French monument since 1990 (Inventaire des Monuments Historiques). The decor includes mahogany paneling by Jean Royere, Harcourt portraits of notable actors and actresses, and discreet brass plaques which indicate the favourite tables of famous people. Most frequent guests own their silver napkin rings with their name engraved on it.

The menu, designed in collaboration with Chef Pierre Gagnaire, continues the tradition of classic French cuisine, including Fouquet's beef tartare, sole meunière, and Simmental beef fillet with Champs-Elysées sauce.

Although the name of the restaurant's founder, [Louis] Fouquet, is pronounced in the standard French way, rhyming with "bouquet", the restaurant name is pronounced with a hard "t" and "s", rhyming with the English word "nets".

In 1998, Fouquet's was purchased by Groupe Barrière. Then, the family owned group created Hotel Barrière Le Fouquet's Paris by acquiring six buildings around the brasserie. Groupe Barrière inaugurated other Fouquet's restaurants in France (Cannes, Toulouse, Courchevel, La Baule, Enghien-les-Bains), Switzerland (Montreux), Morocco (Marrakesh), and the United Arab Emirates (in the Louvre Abu Dhabi).

In March 2019, the restaurant was severely damaged during the yellow vest protests, reopening a few months later for Bastille Day, July 14, 2019.

== See also ==
- Hôtel Barrière Le Fouquet's
- List of French restaurants
