= Notre-Dame-de-la-Sagesse Chapel =

Chapel in Paris, France

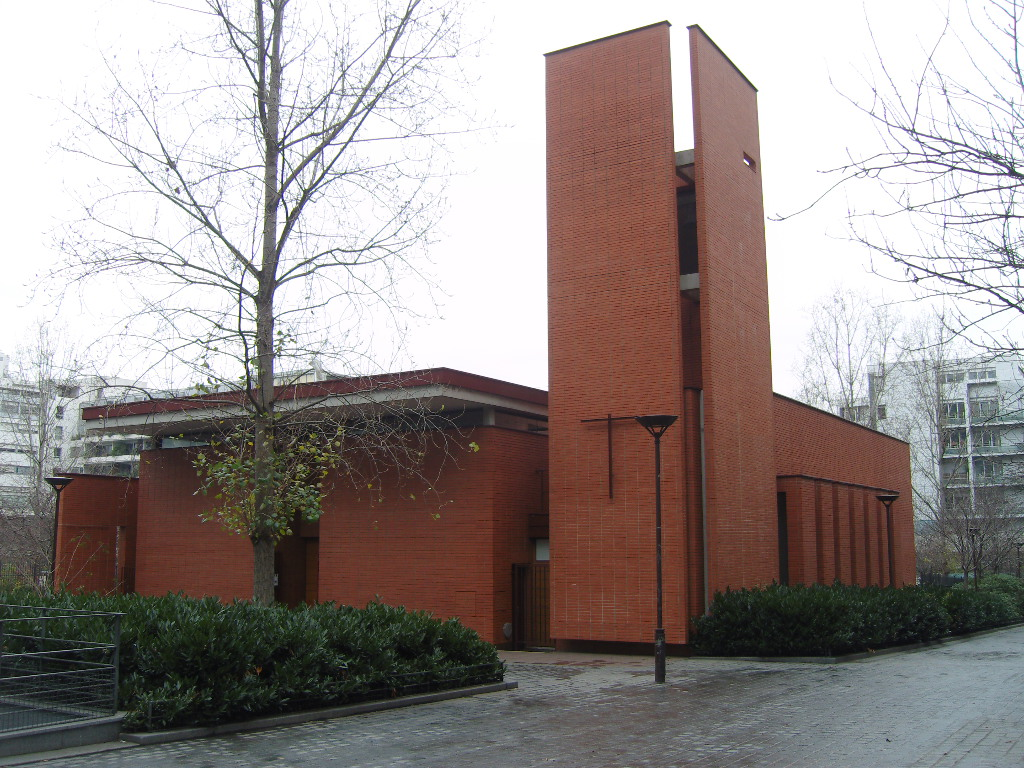

Religion
- Affiliation: Roman Catholic
- District: 13th arrondissement of Paris
- Province: Paris
- Region: Ile-de-France

Location
- Country: France
- Interactive map of Notre-Dame-de-la-Sagesse Chapel
- Coordinates: 48.835694°N 2.373472°E

Architecture
- Architect: Pierre-Louis Faloci

The chapel of Notre Dame de la Sagesse (French; La chapelle Notre-Dame-de-la-Sagesse is a church in the Paris Rive Gauche neighborhood, in the 13th arrondissement of Paris.

== History ==
The construction of the building in the heart of Paris Rive Gauche was a wish of the developer of ZAC, the SEMAPA, who sold the land to the diocese.

== Interior ==
Very minimalist, it uses raw concrete, red Swedish granite and wood.

On the wall is an icon of Thérèse of Lisieux.
