= La Baule-les-Pins =

Coordinates: 47.2852°N 2.3711°W

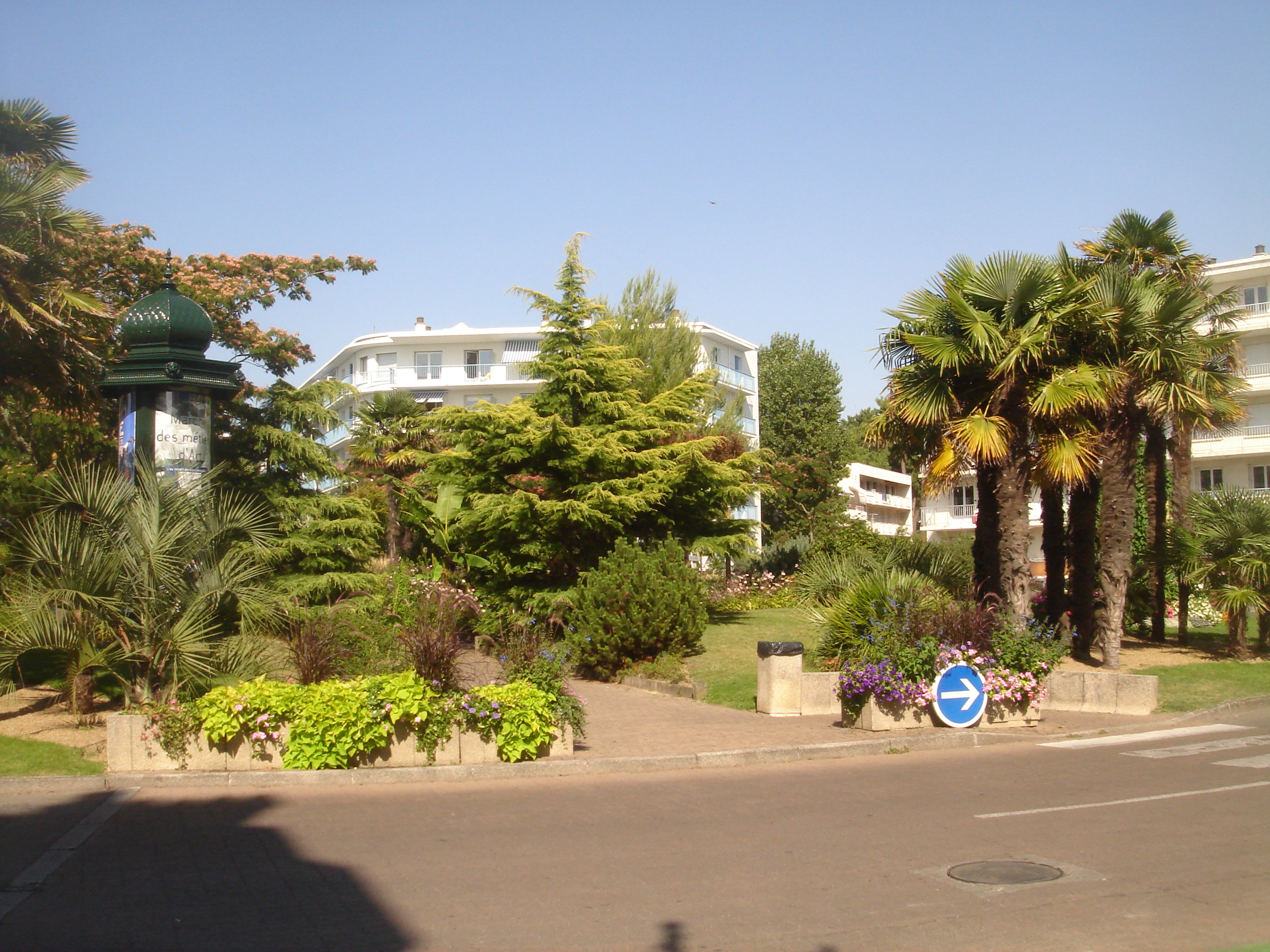
Place des palmiers, central point of La Baule-les-Pins

La Baule-les-Pins is a quartier of La Baule-Escoublac, Loire-Atlantique, France. La Baule has two gare SNCFs, the barely-used eponymous station, and the main La-Baule-Escoublac.
