= La Baule-Escoublac =

La Baule-Escoublac Écoubiâ (Gallo) Ar Baol-Skoubleg (Breton)
- Commune
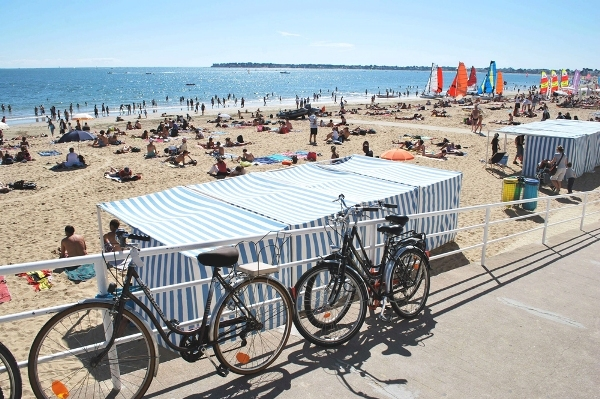

- Coat of arms
- Location of La Baule-Escoublac
- Location within France Location within Pays de la Loire
- Coordinates: 47°17′12″N 2°23′27″W
- Country: France
- Region: Pays de la Loire
- Department: Loire-Atlantique
- Arrondissement: Saint-Nazaire
- Canton: La Baule-Escoublac
- Intercommunality: CA Presqu'île de Guérande Atlantique

Government
  - Mayor (2020–2026): Franck Louvrier
- Area^{1}: 22.19 km^{2} (8.57 sq mi)
- Elevation: 6 m (20 ft)
- Highest elevation: 55 m (180 ft)
- Lowest elevation: 1 m (3.3 ft)
- Population (2023): 16,912
  - Density: 762.1/km^{2} (1,974/sq mi)
- Time zone: UTC+01:00 (CET)
  - Summer (DST): UTC+02:00 (CEST)
- INSEE/Postal code: 44055 /44500
- ^{1} French Land Register data, which excludes lakes, ponds, glaciers > 1 km^{2} (0.386 sq mi or 247 acres) and river estuaries.

La Baule-Escoublac (French pronunciation: [la bol ɛskublak]; Gallo: Écoubiâ, Breton: Ar Baol-Skoubleg, [ar ˈbawl ˈskuːbleːk], before 1962: Escoublac), commonly referred to as La Baule, is a commune in Loire-Atlantique, a department in Pays de la Loire, western France. La Baule beach is one of the longest beaches in Europe.

== History ==
=== Seaside resort ===
In 1879, when the Saint-Nazaire-Croisic railroad was conceived by Parisian industrialist Jules-Joseph Hennecart that the tourist potential of the coast was recognised.

Just before the inauguration of the line, Hennecart bought 40 ha of dunes for the Society of Escoublac Dunes (Société des dunes d'Escoublac) and commissioned local architect Georges Lafont to design the new town. Lafont designed a long sand promenade named Avenue de la Gare (today Avenue du Général-de-Gaulle) and a chapel (see picture). After the railroad opened Lafont built more than 250 villas, taking the lead in the development of the seaside resort.

=== Rise of a seaside resort ===
In 1918, casino business magnate François André (see Groupe Lucien Barrière) set up the redesigning of the La Baule resort based on the Deauville model by combining casinos, luxury hotels and sports facilities all on one site.

In the 1920s, Parisian businessman Louis Lajarrige designed the Bois d'Amour district at La Baule-les-Pins and formed an agreement with the railroad company to move the rails away from the seaside to ensure a direct access to the beach. On 27 July 1927 the new stations of La Baule-les-Pins and La Baule-Escoublac were inaugurated while the old station was torn down to create a flower garden square. By that time, La Baule had become a fashionable seaside resort.

=== Poche de Saint-Nazaire ===
During World War II, La Baule formed part of the protective stretch of coast leading to the nearby harbour city of Saint-Nazaire, home of one of the biggest U-boat stations that the Germans built. It not only serviced the German submarine fleet, but was also the only dry dock on the Atlantic capable of housing the German battleship Tirpitz, one of two Bismarck-class ships built for the German Kriegsmarine during World War II.

La Baule and the surrounding areas were heavily occupied by the Germans throughout World War II. During the occupation, a large number of Jewish residents and resistance members were deported to the concentration camps; in La Baule itself 32 Jewish men, women and children - the youngest of whom was 3 years old - were deported (with the assistance of the local French police) to Auschwitz where they all perished.

In 2011, a small group of local residents formed a group to create a permanent memorial, in the form of Stolperstein, to the 32 Jewish deportees. There was a memorial in La Baule to 40 named war victims, with no mention there or on any other memorial of the 32 Jewish deportees. The Mayor refused to allow a request for the Stolpersteines to be installed, saying that to do so might infringe the French constitutional principles of secularism ("laïcité") and freedom of opinion ("liberté d'opinion") and that the Mairie would therefore need to consult the Conseil d'État, France's constitutional court.

Germans troops fought in La Baule and Saint-Nazaire for nine months longer than in the rest of the department, surrendering on 11 May 1945 (3 days after the German unconditional surrender).

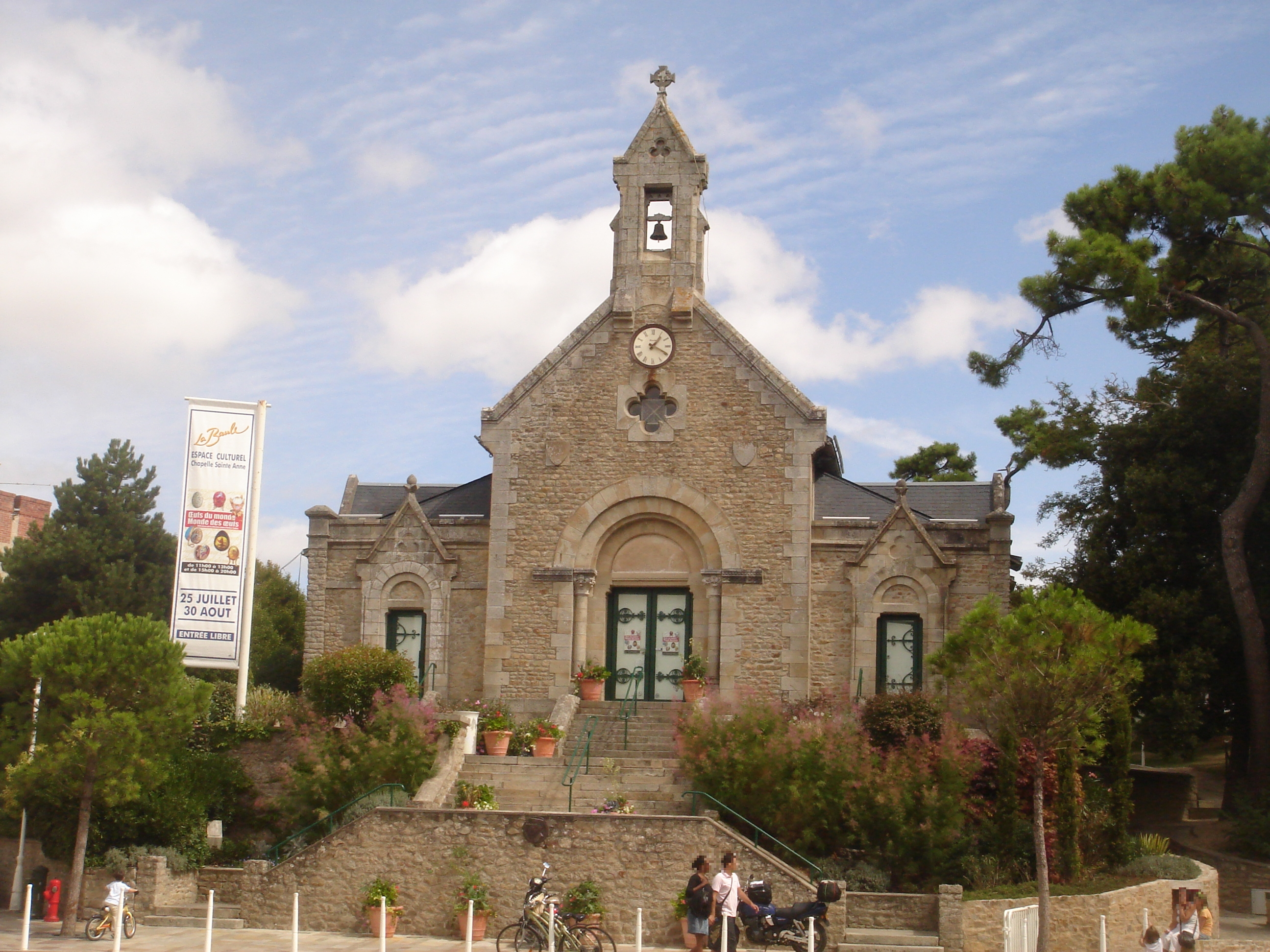
Chapelle Saint-Anne

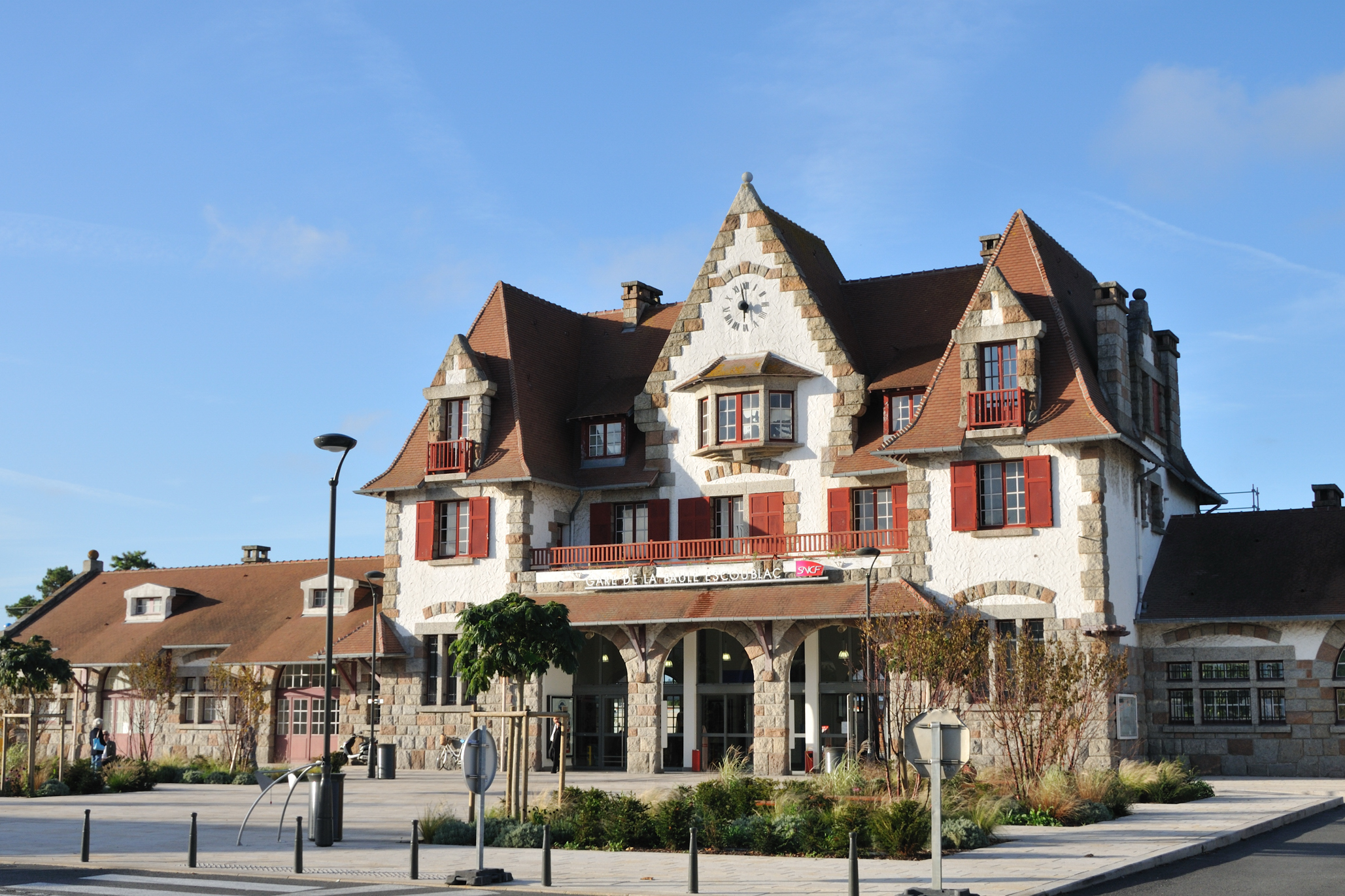
La Baule-Escoublac railroad station

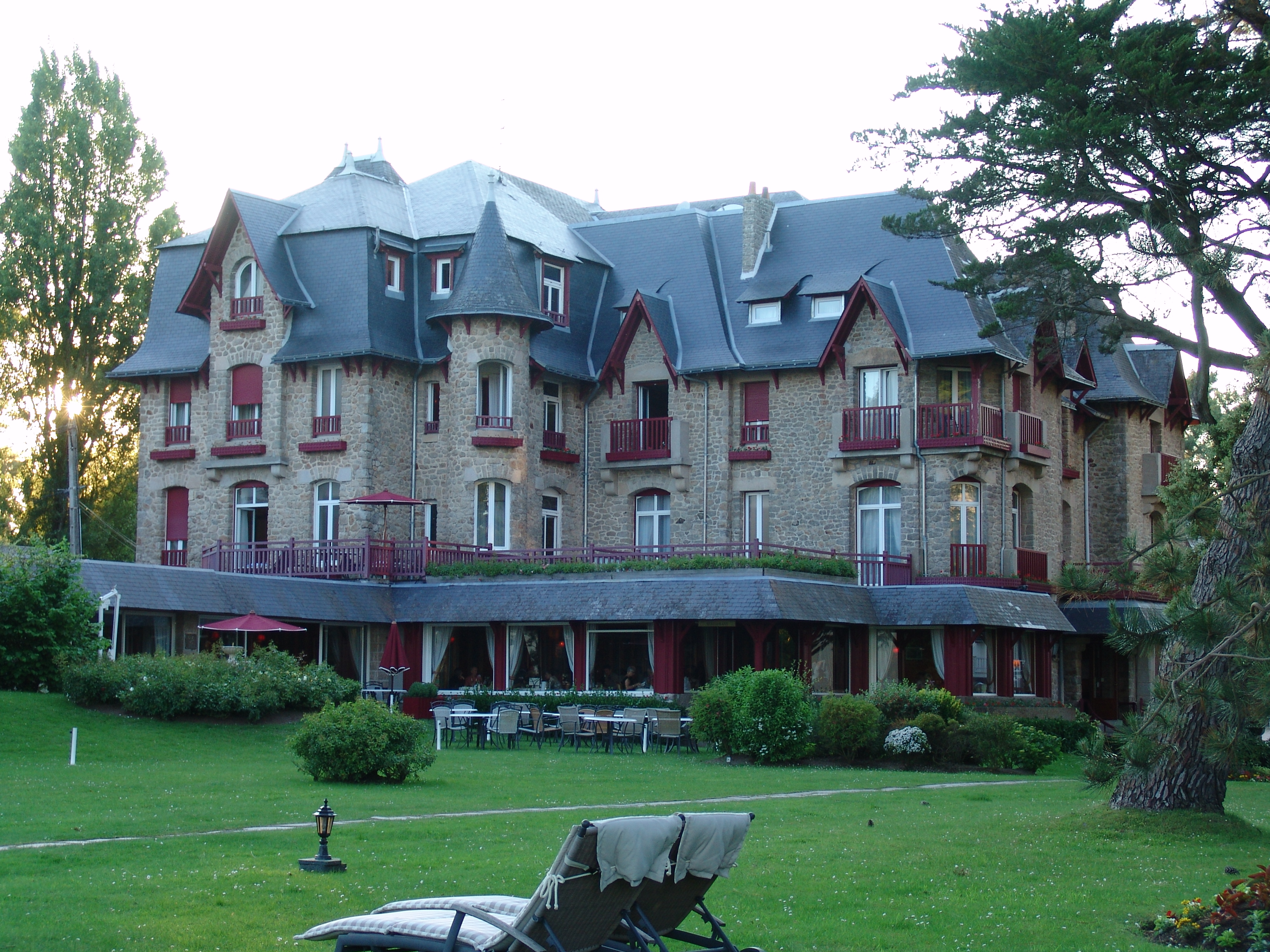
Hôtel Castel Marie-Louise

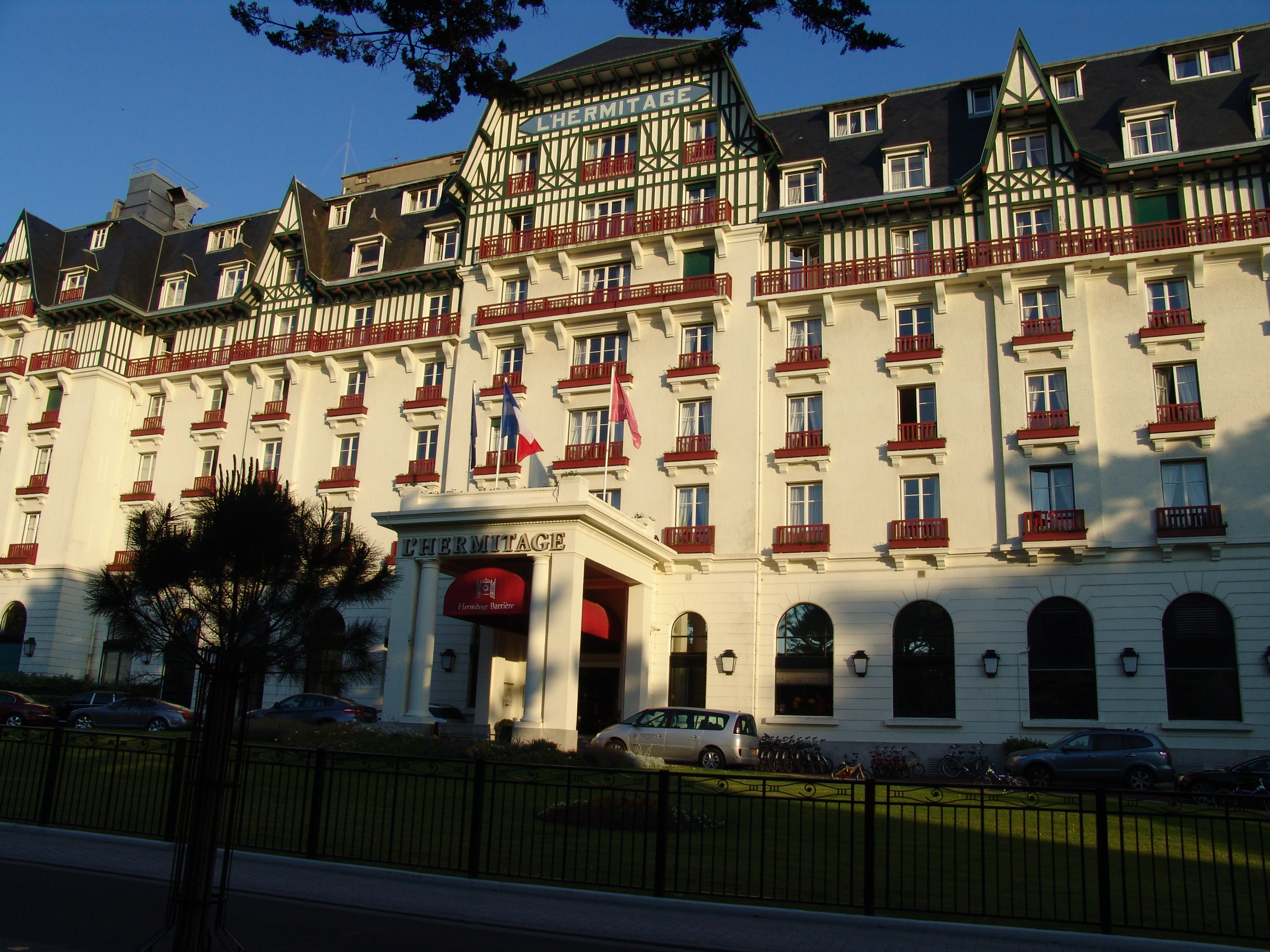
Hôtel Hermitage

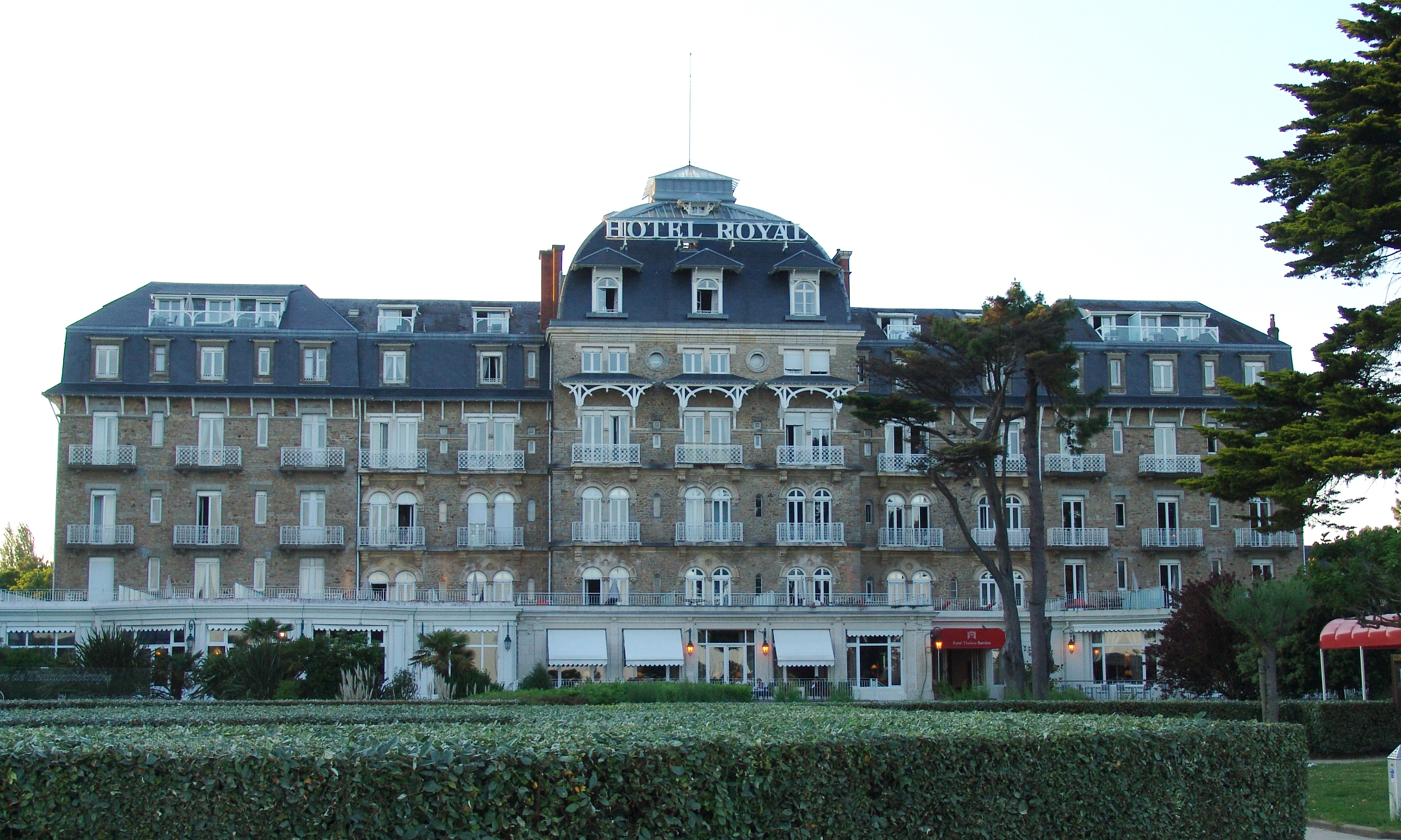
Hôtel Royal

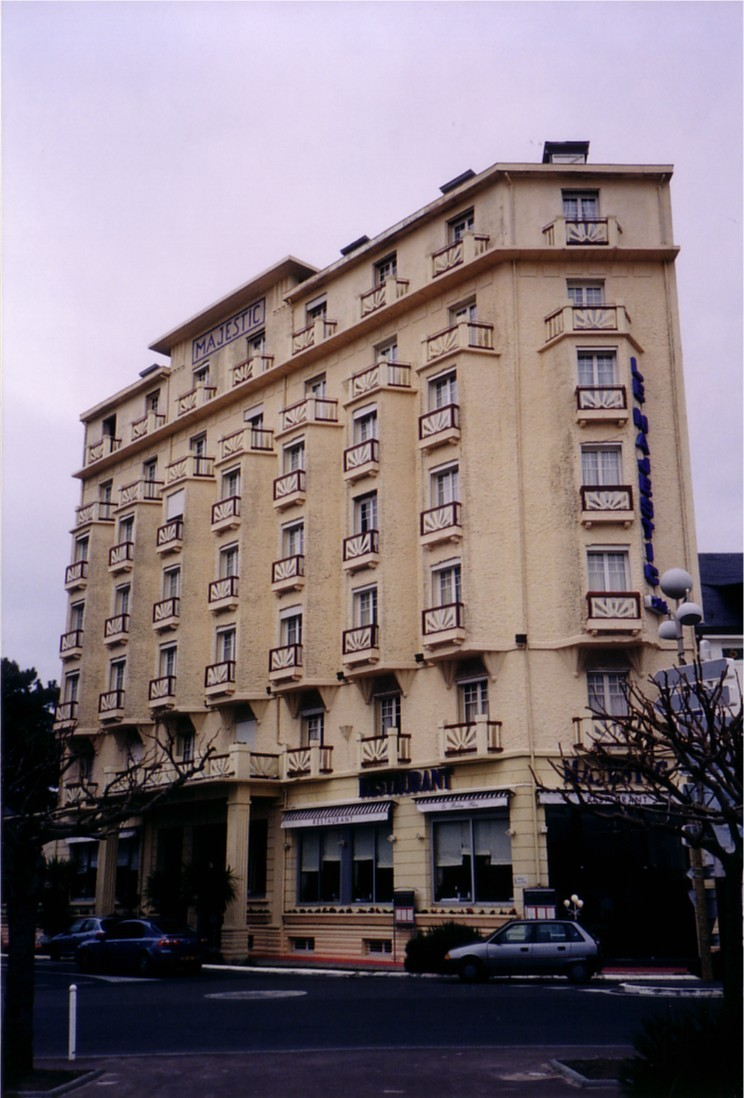
Hôtel Majestic

== Population ==
Historical population

| Year | Pop. | ±% p.a. |
|---|---|---|
| 1793 | 1,600 | — |
| 1800 | 796 | −9.49% |
| 1806 | 1,113 | +5.75% |
| 1821 | 933 | −1.17% |
| 1831 | 1,238 | +2.87% |
| 1841 | 1,190 | −0.39% |
| 1846 | 1,179 | −0.19% |
| 1851 | 1,217 | +0.64% |
| 1856 | 1,180 | −0.62% |
| 1861 | 1,157 | −0.39% |
| 1866 | 1,200 | +0.73% |
| 1872 | 1,172 | −0.39% |
| 1876 | 1,223 | +1.07% |
| 1881 | 1,415 | +2.96% |
| 1886 | 1,535 | +1.64% |
| 1891 | 1,648 | +1.43% |
| 1896 | 1,912 | +3.02% |
| 1901 | 1,777 | −1.45% |

| Year | Pop. | ±% p.a. |
|---|---|---|
| 1906 | 2,167 | +4.05% |
| 1911 | 2,727 | +4.70% |
| 1921 | 3,395 | +2.22% |
| 1926 | 5,051 | +8.27% |
| 1931 | 6,126 | +3.93% |
| 1936 | 6,115 | −0.04% |
| 1946 | 15,205 | +9.54% |
| 1954 | 13,166 | −1.78% |
| 1962 | 13,004 | −0.15% |
| 1968 | 13,336 | +0.42% |
| 1975 | 15,006 | +1.70% |
| 1982 | 14,553 | −0.44% |
| 1990 | 14,845 | +0.25% |
| 1999 | 15,831 | +0.72% |
| 2007 | 16,719 | +0.68% |
| 2012 | 15,474 | −1.54% |
| 2017 | 16,132 | +0.84% |
| 2023 | 16,912 | +0.79% |

Source: EHESS and INSEE (1968-2023)

== Culture ==
=== La Baule Professional Tennis Championships ===
There were several pro tennis tournaments held at La Baule on red clay courts.

=== Grand Prix de la Baule (automobiles) ===
The Grand Prix de la Baule was a Grand Prix motor racing event held there during the 1930s.

=== Grand Prix de la Baule (equestrian) ===
The Grand Prix de la Ville de La Baule is an equestrian jumping competition part of the international Equestrian Nations Cup series.

=== Tourism ===
The Musée Aéronautique Presqu'île Côte d'Amour (MAPICA), located at the airport, maintains a collection of restored historical French aircraft in flying condition.

== People linked to the commune ==
- Lluís Companys i Jover (1882-1940)
- William Grover-Williams (1903-1945)
- Henri Anger (1907–1989), novelist
- Gérard Lecointe (1912-2009)
- Olivier Guichard (1920–2004)
- Lucien Barrière (1923-1991)
- Édouard Luntz
- Dominique Desseigne (1944)
- Marc Pajot, (1953)
- Bruno Peyron, (1955)
- Lolo Ferrari (1963-2000)
- Charlotte Di Calypso

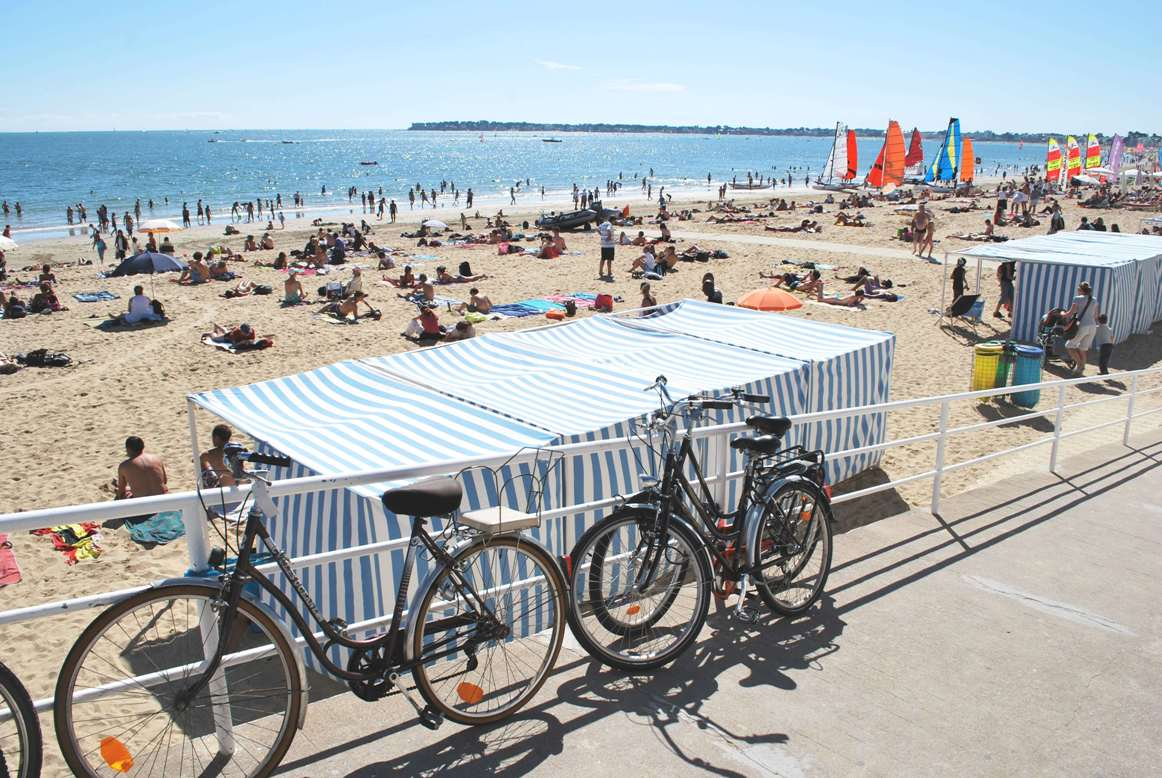
Beach view of La Baule-Escoublac

== International relations ==
La Baule-Escoublac is twinned with:

- Nowy Sącz in Poland
- Inverness, Scotland
- Homburg, Saarland, Germany, since 1984
- Corfu, Greece

== See also ==
- Communes of the Loire-Atlantique department
- La Baule – Guérande Peninsula
- Parc naturel régional de Brière
