= Dominique Desseigne =

French businessperson (born 19 August 1944)

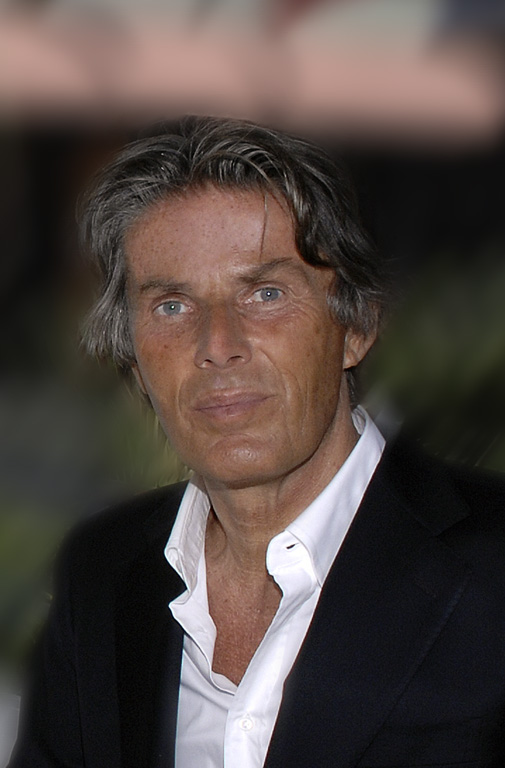
- Desseigne in 2008
- Born: 19 August 1944 (age 81); Commercy, France
- Occupation: Honorary Chairman of Groupe Lucien Barrière
- Children: 3

Dominique Desseigne (born 19 August 1944) is a French businessperson and billionaire. He is the son-in-law of Lucien Barrière and was the chief executive of Groupe Lucien Barrière between 2001 and 2023, before being appointed Honorary Chairman.

After refusing to submit to a paternity test, he was recognized by a court of law as the father of Rachida Dati's child.
