= Hotel Barrière Le Normandy Deauville =

Hotel in Deauville, France

- Interactive map of the Hotel Barrière Le Normandy Deauville area

General information
- Location: Deauville, France
- Coordinates: 49.36°N 0.070853°E
- Completed: 1912
- Opened: 1912
- Owner: Groupe Barrière

Design and construction
- Architect: Théo Petit

Other information
- Number of rooms: 226
- Number of suites: 45

Website
- Official website

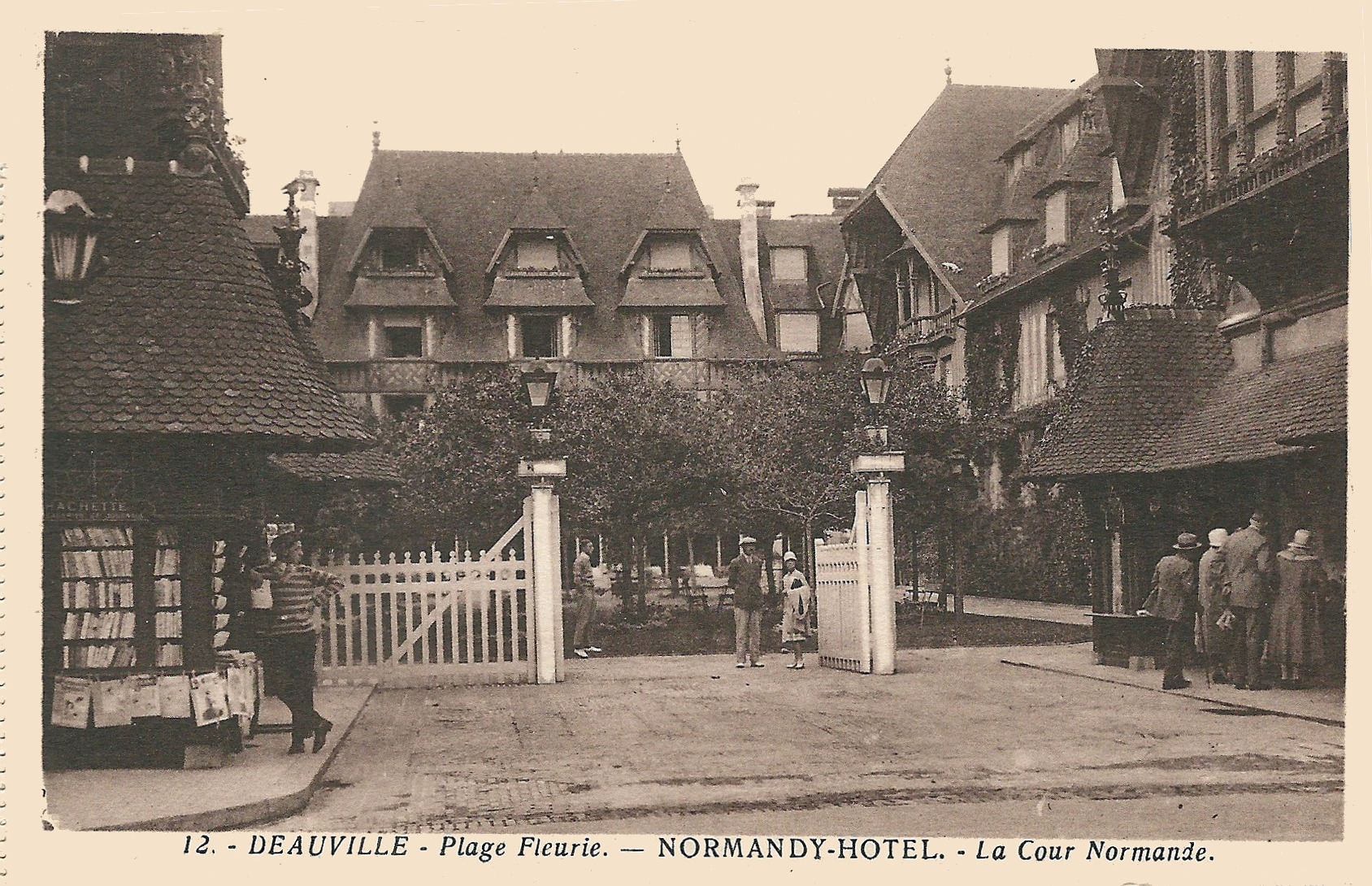
Hôtel Normandy in 1930

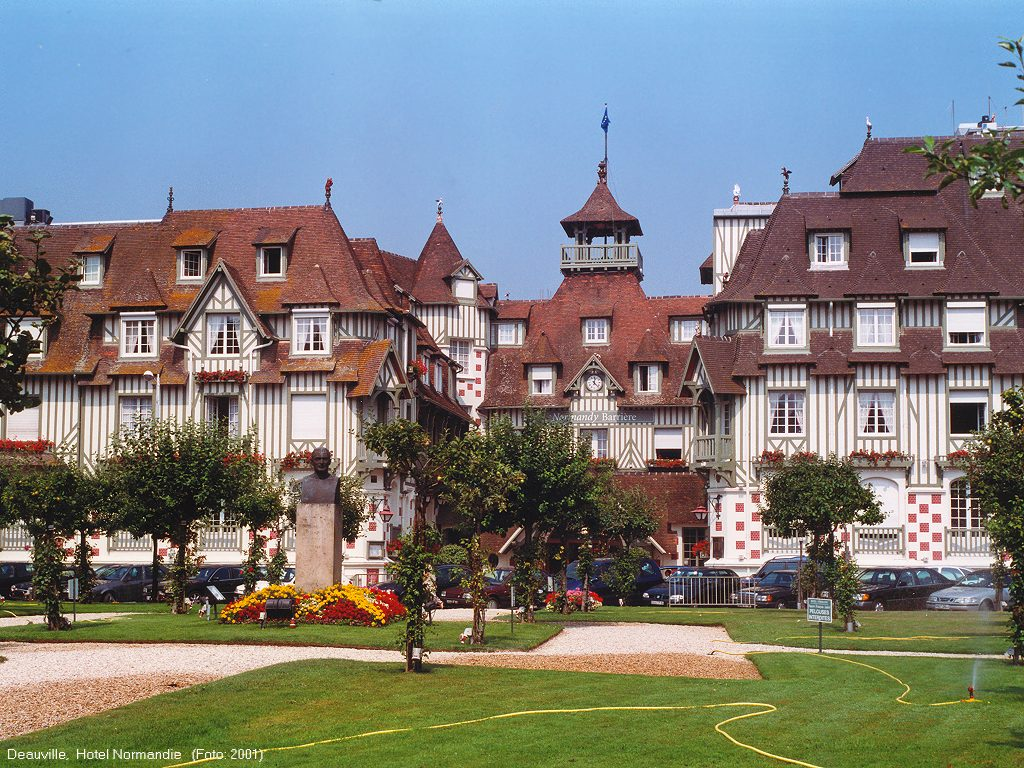
The Normandy Barrière

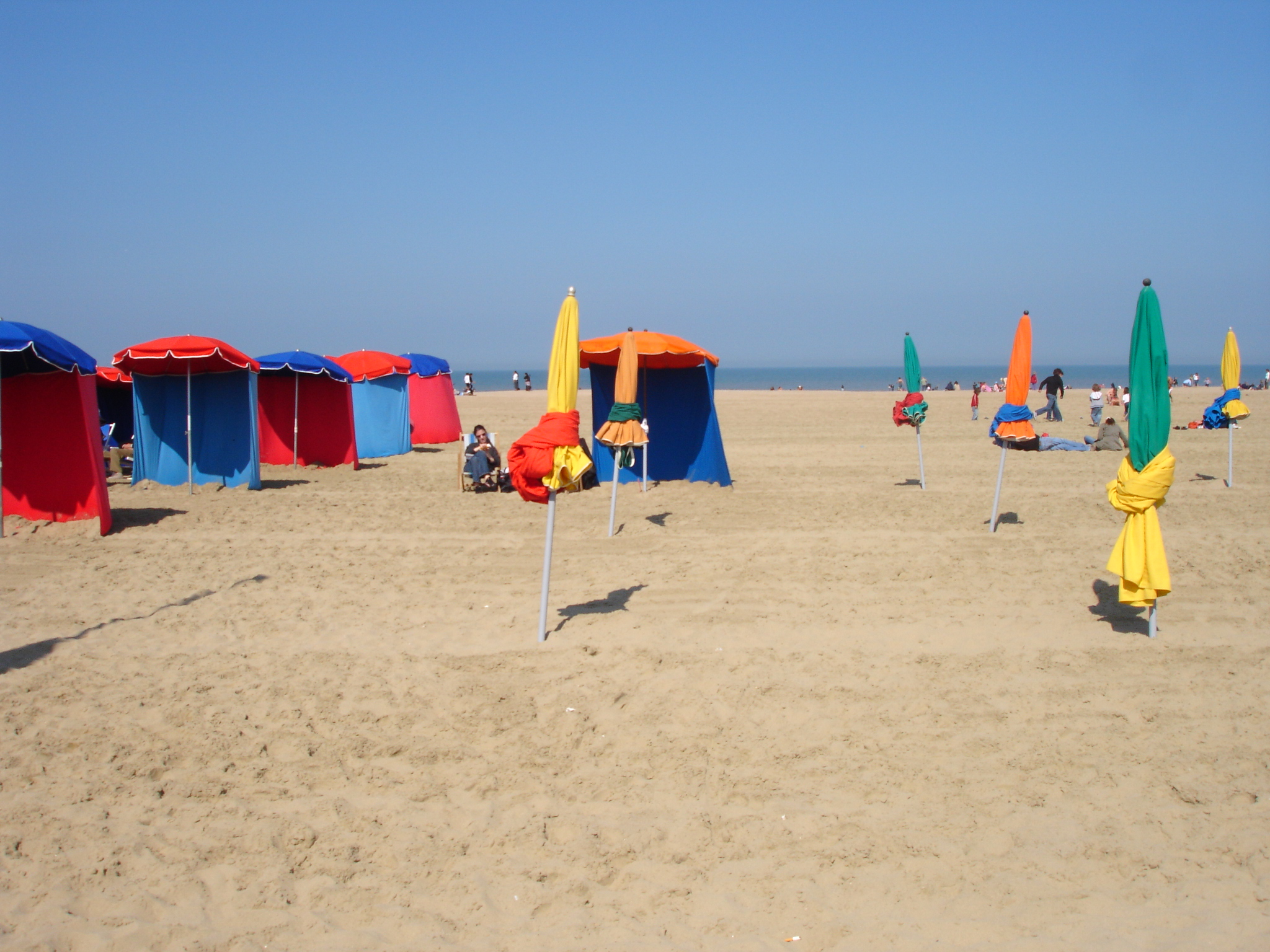
The beach of the Normandy Barrière

The Hotel Barrière Le Normandy Deauville is a grand hotel of the Groupe Lucien Barrière in Deauville, Normandy. It was built as the Hôtel Normandy in 1912.

== History ==
The Hôtel Normandy was opened in 1912 by architect Théo Petit, following the opening of the nearby Casino of Deauville. Both were opened by Eugène Cornuché, the former owner of Maxim's restaurant in Paris and director of the Trouville-sur-Mer casino. In the next year, he opened the Royal Barrière Hotel in Deauville. Later, his partner, François André, took over management of the hotel. In 1927, he built the Hôtel du Golf. In 1962, the Groupe Lucien Barrière was founded. The hotel is considered the flagship hotel of Groupe Barrière.

One year after its opening, funded by her English lover Boy Capel, Coco Chanel set up her Chanel hat shop within the hotel grounds.

== Hotel ==
Hotel Barrière Le Normandy Deauville is a palace hotel built in a traditional regional architecture of manor style— Anglo-Norman cottage with half-timbered and checkered stones. It has 226 rooms and 45 suites, decorated by interior designer Jacques Garcia and inspired by the Belle Époque style. Most of the rooms have a view of the sea. Nineteen lounges host conferences, receptions, cocktails, and gala evenings. The suite "A Man and a Woman" is kept in memory and tribute to the love scene from Claude Lelouch's 1966 film A Man and a Woman. The main restaurant is La Belle époque. The hotel also features a piano bar offering a menu of more than one hundred varieties of whiskey, a fitness center, a spa, and a children's club. It has an inside corridor that directly leads to the Casino of Deauville.

The hotel was renovated in 2015–2016.

== TV and Films ==
The hotel was used as a filming location for several TV shows and films, such in 1996, when it was used as the location for Agatha Christie's Poirot in the episode The Murder on the Links. The episode is adapted from a novel with the same name that was published in 1923. The events originally take place in a fictional town called Merlinville-sur-Mer in northern France in the 1920s, however, in the adaptation, the events take place in Deauville a decade later. The 2013 romantic comedy film Hôtel Normandy is named after the hotel, with its main character, Alice, staying at the hotel. A scene in Claude Lelouch's Palme d'Or-winner A Man and a Woman was shot in the hotel, starring Anouk Aimée and Jean-Louis Trintignant.
