= Groupe Lucien Barrière =

French casino and hotel company founded 1912

- Type: Private
- Industry: activities of head offices
- Founded: 1912; 114 years ago
- Founder: François André
- Headquarters: Paris, France,
- Key people: Lucien Barrière; Diane Barrière-Desseigne; Dominique Desseigne; management: Alexandre Barrière, Joy Desseigne-Barrière, Co-chairs
- Services: Hotels, Casinos, on-line Poker, Restaurants and bars, Leisure and Health activities
- Revenue: 1,065 M€ (as of 31 October 2009)

Groupe Barrière is a brand under which two groups are marketed: Groupe Lucien Barrière (GLB) and Société fermière du casino municipal de Cannes (SFCMC). It was founded in 1912 by François André, and then managed – in succession – by Lucien Barrière, Diane Barrière-Desseigne, Dominique Desseigne, then Alexandre Barrière and Joy Desseigne-Barrière. It operates casinos in Europe. The group also operates in the French luxury hotel industry and in the catering and leisure industries.

== History ==
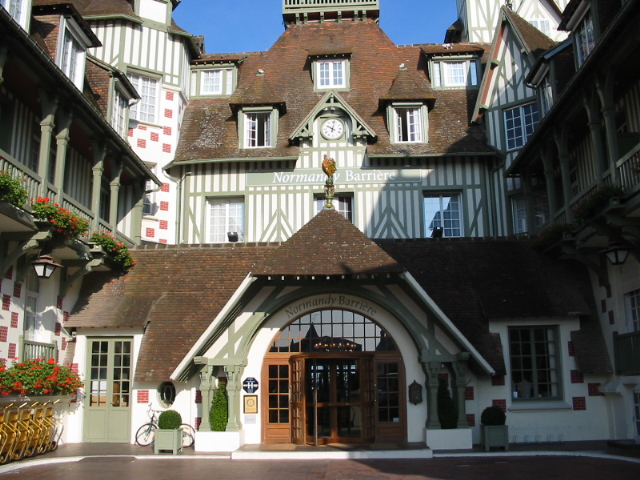
5 Stars Normandy Hotel, Deauville

=== François André, founder ===
- 1912–1951: re-inventing the Deauville and La Baule seaside resorts

As a young man from Ardèche who came up to Paris in the early 20th century, François André started a casino business by acquiring the Ostend casino in Belgium, while Eugène Cornuché, his partner, began building the Hôtel Normandy and having the Deauville casino rebuilt in 1912. In 1918, François André set up the Haussmann gaming circle in Paris and continued to grow his business by designing the La Baule resort based on the Deauville model and by purchasing the Hôtel Royal and casino in 1923. He invented the modern day resort concept by combining casinos, luxury hotels and sports facilities all on one site.

In 1926, François André took on the construction of the Hôtel Hermitage at La Baule.

in 1927, he took over from Eugène Cornuché as managing director of SHCD (Société des Hôtels et Casino de Deauville). He then had the Hôtel du Golf in Deauville built.

=== Lucien Barrière ===
- 1951–1987 – Groupe Lucien Barrière's founding and development throughout France

In 1951, Lucien Barrière, François André's nephew, joined the group.

In 1957 Lucien Barrière was appointed to the Board of several of the group's entities and became his uncle's sole legal heir in 1961. He undertook a project to modernise and develop the group by buying new establishments in Trouville-sur-Mer, Dinard, Saint-Malo, Royan and Enghien-les-Bains.

For a time, the group's expansion came up against the licensing system, which firmly regulated the gambling sector. In 1981, the managers of the Palm Beach casino in Cannes, which belonged to the Barrière group, were implicated in a fraud case, accused of violating the legislation on gaming regulations due to improper roulette payments. The Barrière group believed that it was being blackmailed by the Socialist government to obtain a license.

In 1980, SHCLB (Société Hôtelière de la Chaîne Lucien Barrière) was founded to cover the La Baule hotels and casinos.

In 1987, Lucien Barrière participated in the arrival of slot machines in France.

=== Diane Barrière-Desseigne ===
- 1990–2000:

In the early 1990s, Accor became a major SHCLB shareholder.

In 1990, Diane Barrière-Desseigne succeeded her father, Lucien Barrière, and launched major renovation projects. On top of their prestige, the hotels are closely connected to the film industry and the Arts. The elite figures of the film industry visit the Normandy Barrière and the Royal Barrière during the American Film Festival in Deauville.

In 1995, Diane Barrière-Desseigne suffered a very serious plane accident and from 1997, her husband Dominique Desseigne co-managed the SHCD and SHCLB at her side.

In 1998, SHCD bought Fouquet's restaurant and brand.

Diane Barrière-Desseigne died in 2001. Dominique Desseigne took over group management and became chairman of SFCMC.

=== Dominique Desseigne ===
- Since 2001: Under the chairmanship of Dominique Desseigne, the SHCD and the SHCLB took on a new dimension with the first international developments.

In 2003, SHCLB opened the Casino Barrière de Montreux in Switzerland, which became the leading casino in Switzerland in 2008 in terms of total gross gaming takings.

During the same year, SHCD took over the Ryads Resort Development, owner of the land on which the Hôtel Naoura Barrière in Marrakesh (Morocco) was later built, supported by top ranking investors who purchased an equity stake in Ryads Resort Development.

In 2004, the Desseigne-Barrière family, Accor and Colony Capital investment funds decided to team up as Société Hôtelière de la Chaîne Lucien Barrière, subsequently renamed Groupe Lucien Barrière, which combined the businesses of SHCD, SHCLB and Accor Casinos to create a prestigious casino and hotel group.

Since 2005, the expansion has continued with the opening of casinos in Toulouse, Cairo, Leucate, Blotzheim and Lille, the opening of the Naoura Barrière in Marrakesh, Hôtel Fouquet's Barrière in Paris and the Spark (fitness centre for treatments, sport and Spa) in Enghien-les-Bains. The Hôtel Barrière Lille opened during autumn 2010 and the hotel complex and balneo-therapy centre adjoining the Casino Barrière de Ribeauvillé was forecast to open late 2011.

During the same period, the public service concessions of the Barrière Casinos in La Baule, Dinard, Deauville, Saint-Malo, Nice, Cassis and Saint-Raphaël were renewed, which revealed the confidence these towns place in the group.

On 15 April 2009, Colony Capital sold its Groupe Lucien Barrière shares to Accor, which now holds a 49% equity stake in the company.

In 2010, Groupe Lucien Barrière and Française des Jeux designed an on-line gaming platform with 3D online gaming, which is called LB Poker company.

== Groupe Barrière establishments ==
=== Hotels ===
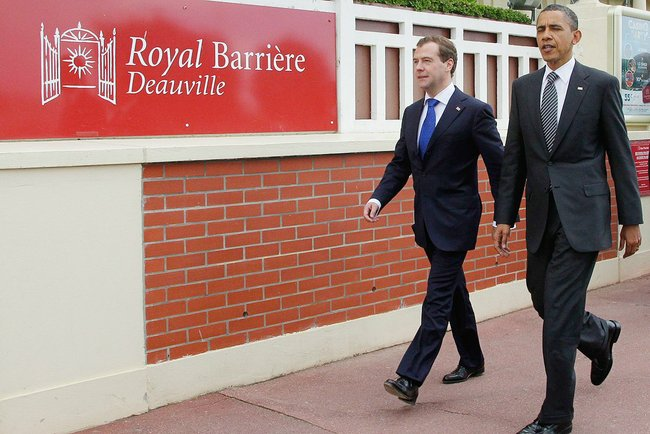
Russian president Dmitry Medvedev and US president Barack Obama at the Royal Barrière during the 37th G8 summit in May 2011.

Barrière includes 19 hotels (16 in Metropolitan France, 1 in Saint Barthélemy, 1 in Marrakesh and 1 in Greece), with a majority of hotels ranked as five star.

Paris

- Hotel Barrière Le Fouquet's Paris*****

Deauville

- Hotel Barrière Le Normandy *****
- Hotel Barrière Le Royal Deauville*****
- Hôtel du Golf ****

Cannes

- Hotel Barrière Le Majestic Cannes *****
- Le Gray D'Albion Barrière *****

Courchevel

- Hotel Barrière Les Neiges Courchevel *****

Dinard

- Grand Hôtel Dinard*****

Enghien-les-Bains

- Grand Hôtel Enghien ****
- Hôtel du Lac****

Le Touquet

- Le Westminster ****

La Baule

- Castel Marie-Louise *****
- Le Royal La Baule *****
- L' Hermitage *****

Marrakesh

- Hôtel & Ryads Le Naoura *****

Lille

- Resort Barrière Lille *****

Ribeauvillé

- Resort Barrière Ribeauvillé ****

Saint Barthélemy

- Hôtel Barrière Le Carl Gustaf ***** (end of 2017)

Mykonos

- Fouquet's Mykonos *****

=== Casinos ===
The 37 casinos are located in resorts along the French coast and in major cities.

==== France ====
La Baule, Bénodet, Besançon, Biarritz, Blotzheim, Bordeaux, Briançon, Carnac, Carry-le-Rouet, Cassis, Chamonix, Dax, Deauville, Dinard, Enghien-les-Bains, Jonzac, Leucate, Lille, Menton, Nice, Le Ruhl, Bad Niederbronn, Ouistreham, Perros-Guirec, Royan, Ribeauvillé, La Rochelle, Les Sables d'Olonne, Saint-Malo, Sainte-Maxime, Saint-Raphaël, Toulouse, Le Touquet and Trouville-sur-Mer.

==== Switzerland ====
Courrendlin, Fribourg and Montreux Casino.

==== Egypt ====
Cairo.

=== Restaurants and bars ===
Groupe Lucien Barrière has 131 bars and restaurants throughout the group's casinos and hotels, which range from snacks to 5-star cuisine, as well as Fouquet's brasseries in Paris, Toulouse and Marrakesh.

=== Sport and well-being ===
- Spark, soins, sport et spa – Enghien-les-Bains
- Le Spa Diane Barrière de l'Hôtel Barrière Le Fouquet's – Paris
- Le Spa Diane Barrière du Naoura Barrière – Marrakesh
- Centre de thalassothérapie Thalgo – La Baule

Golf courses

- Golf Barrière – Deauville
- Golf Barrière de Saint-Julien – Deauville
- Golf International Barrière – La Baule

Tennis clubs

- Tennis club de l'Hôtel du Golf – Deauville
- Tennis Country Club Barrière – La Baule
