= Quartier de la Gare =

Coordinates: 48.8280734°N 2.3721479°E

Gare
- Quartier de la Gare
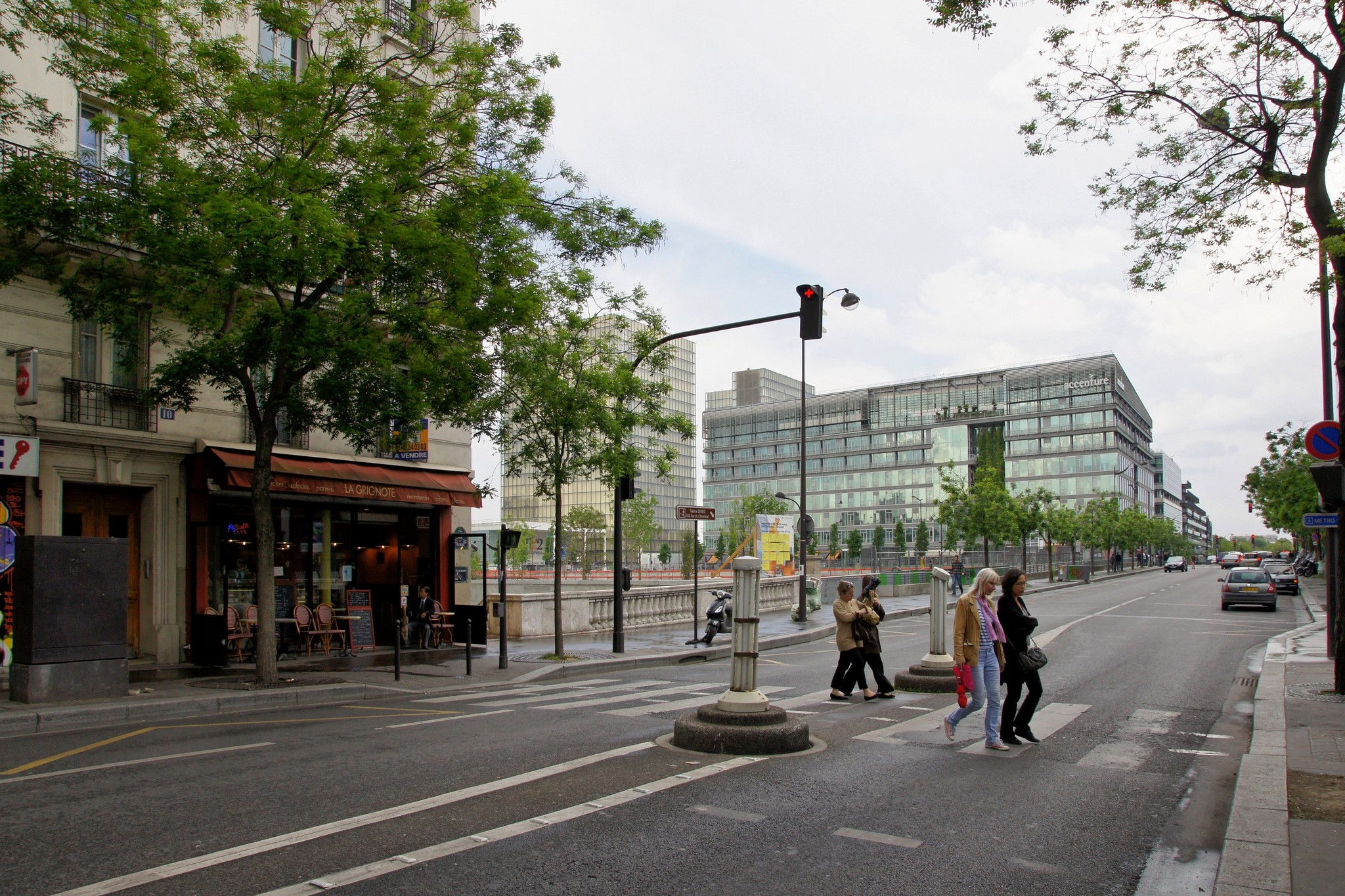
- Rue de Tolbiac
- Country: France
- Region: Île-de-France
- Ville: Paris
- Arrondissement: 13th

Area
  - Total: 3.044 km^{2} (1.175 sq mi)

Population (2016)
  - Total: 72,129
  - Density: 23,695/km^{2} (61,370/sq mi)

The Quartier de la Gare is the 50th administrative quarter of Paris, located within the 13th arrondissement. Its name refers to the former river station (gare fluviale, in French) on the Seine, around which the settlement developed that would become the origin of the present-day neighborhood.

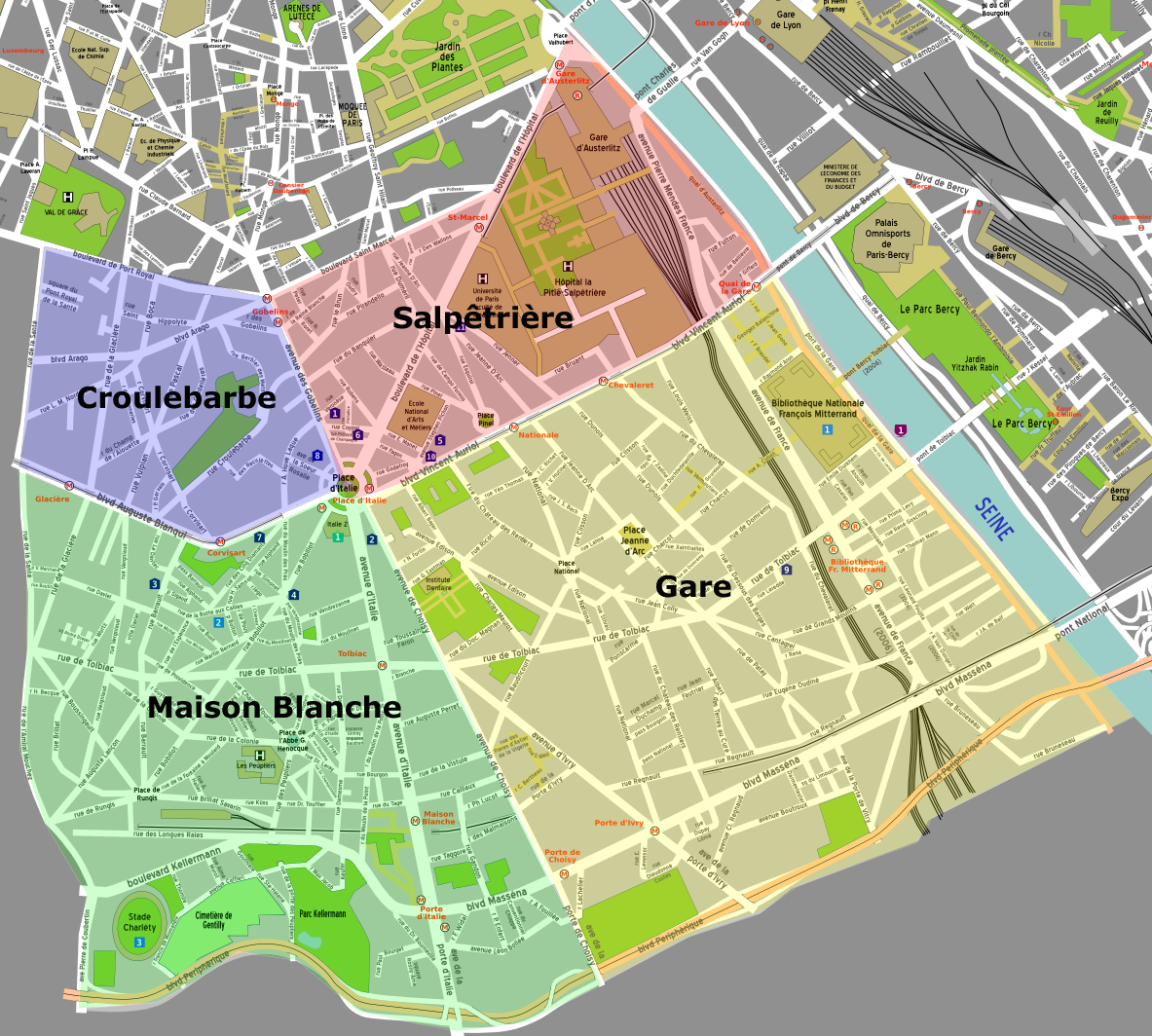
The quarters of the 13th arrondissement.

== Location ==
The neighborhood is bounded to the north by the Boulevard Vincent-Auriol (known as the Boulevard de la Gare until 1976), to the east by the Seine, to the south by the municipalities of Ivry-sur-Seine and Le Kremlin-Bicêtre, and to the west by the Avenue de Choisy. It is the largest neighborhood in Paris, with an area of 304.4 hectares and an estimated population of 69,000 inhabitants.

== Places of interest ==
- The Bibliothèque nationale de France has one of its sites—the François Mitterrand site, inaugurated in 1996—in this neighborhood.
- Most of the facilities of the Paris Cité University are also located here.
- The Church of Notre-Dame-de-la-Gare is a Neo-Romanesque parish church built in the mid-19th century.
- Station F, the world's largest startup facility
- Within the administrative neighborhood of La Gare lies the area known as the "Asian quarter" (Quartier asiatique) of Paris, which has a very high concentration of residents with origins in the Far East. This Parisian Chinatown, located in the 13th arrondissement, is centered within the triangle formed by Avenue de Choisy, Avenue d'Ivry, and Boulevard Masséna, as well as around the Olympiades metro station.
