= Édouard François =

French architect

François's Tower-Flower building

Édouard François (born April 2, 1957 in Boulogne-Billancourt) is a French architect known for his environmentally friendly buildings. He was described as "The Hero of Green Architecture" by the Financial Times for his Tower-Flower.

== Biography ==
A graduate of the École nationale supérieure des Beaux-Arts de Paris and the École nationale des ponts et chaussées, François has been an architect and urban planner since 1986. He founded his own architecture, urban planning, and design firm in 1998, and is known for designing L’Immeuble qui pousse, completed in 2000 in Montpellier, and Tower-Flower, completed in Paris in 2004.

François has taught at the Architectural Association School of Architecture in London, the École Spéciale d'Architecture in Paris, and the Design Academy Eindhoven. His work has been exhibited internationally, notably at the Canadian Centre for Architecture in Montreal, the Solomon R. Guggenheim Museum in New York, the Victoria and Albert Museum in London, and the Venice Architecture Biennale, as well as in Germany, Belgium, Lebanon, India, Brazil, and China.

He received the International Forum of Young Architects Award, presented in 2008 in Sofia. In 2011, François was named Designer of the Year, and the Royal Institute of British Architects appointed him an International Fellow (Int. Fellow RIBA) for his contribution to architecture. In 2012, he was awarded the title of Knight of Arts and Letters by the Ministry of Culture and Communication.

In 2012, his firm became Maison Édouard François.
