= Lucien Barrière =

French businessman (1923–1990)

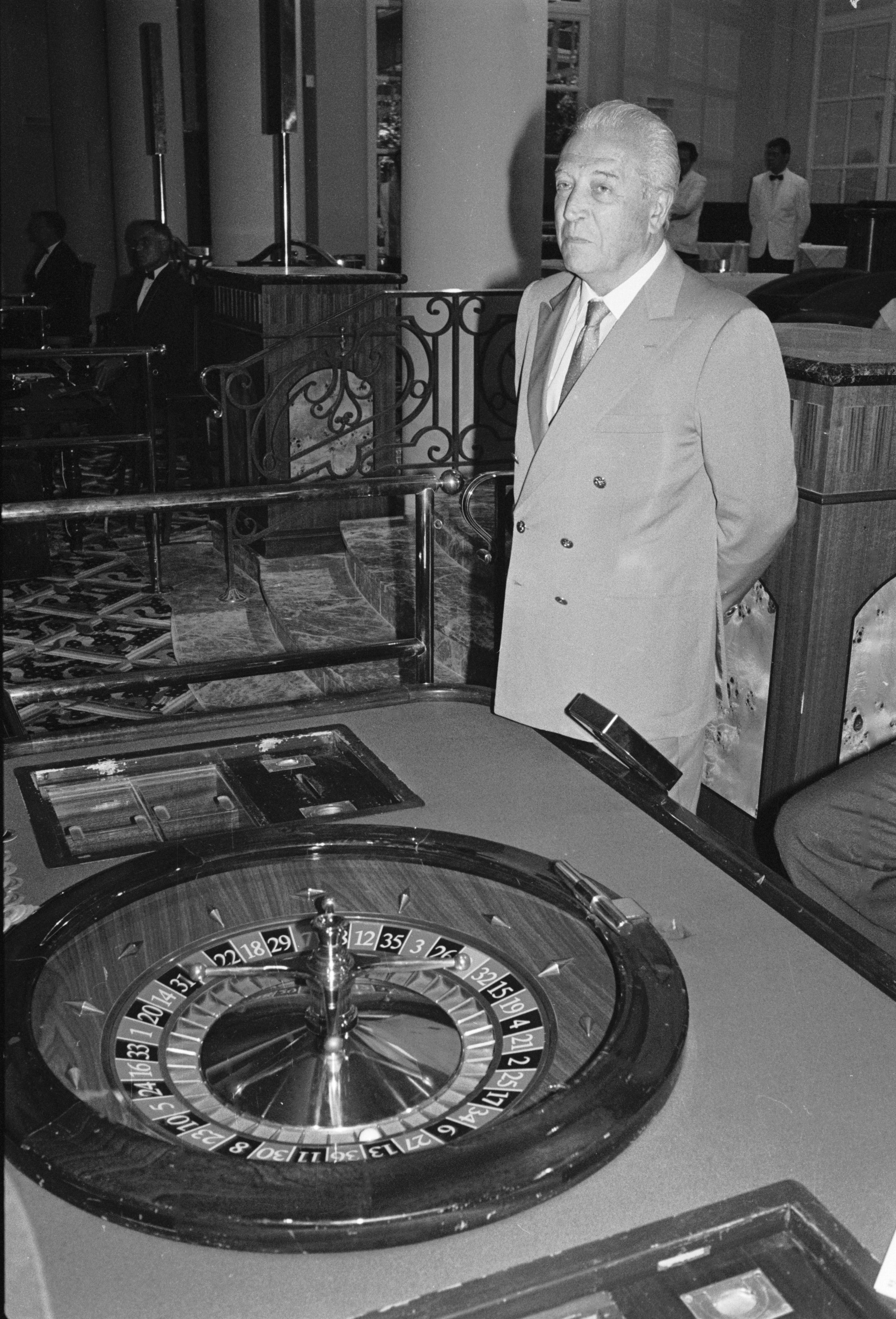
- Born: 14 January 1923; Rosières, France
- Died: 17 September 1990 (aged 67); Caen, France
- Occupation: Businessman
- Known for: Founder of Lucien Barrière group

Lucien Barrière (14 January 1923 – 17 September 1990) was a prominent French entrepreneur and businessman, best known as the founder and heir of the Lucien Barrière group. This group stands as one of the largest conglomerates comprising casinos, luxury hotels, resorts, and restaurants.

== Biography ==
He was born in Ardèche, a region in Southeastern France, from a modest, goat raising family.

In 1962, he was chosen by his uncle François André, who had no direct descendants, to succeed him as head of several successful companies specializing in casinos and luxury hotels operation. The company's flagship assets included renowned establishments such as the casinos of Deauville, Cannes, and La Baule, along with esteemed hotels like the Normandy Barrière, Royal Barrière, and the Hôtel du Golf Barrière de Deauville.

In 1959, he became the general manager of the group. For thirty years he developed the successful Barriere empire following the same policy as his predecessor: luxury, sophistication, perfection, elegance, refinement, friendliness, and cultivating the French joie de vivre.

He married Martha Szentgyörgyi (died 11 October 2008), a Hungarian dancer. Martha had a daughter from a previous marriage, Diane, born in 1957, whom he adopted and raised as his own. He taught her the know-how of the trade, before designating her as the sole heir of his luxury empire.

In 1962, he founded the Lucien Barrière group, one of the first French companies charged with managing casinos and luxury hotels.

In 1975, Lucien Barrière sponsored the creation of the Deauville American Film Festival, alongside the major proponents of this idea, the Mayor of Deauville Michel d'Ornano, André Halimi and Lionel Shushan.

In 1990, he died at Caen University Hospital at the age of 67 due to cardiac arrest, following complications resulting from a coronary angioplasty carried out by Professor Grollier. Diane, married to the notary Dominique Desseigne, succeeded her adoptive father as head of the group and pursued the same successful policy as her predecessors. In July 1995 she was the victim of a serious plane crash that left her quadriplegic, and later died in May 2001 at 44 years.
