= Paris Rive Gauche =

Neighborhood in Paris, France

Coordinates: 48°50′00″N 2°22′34″E

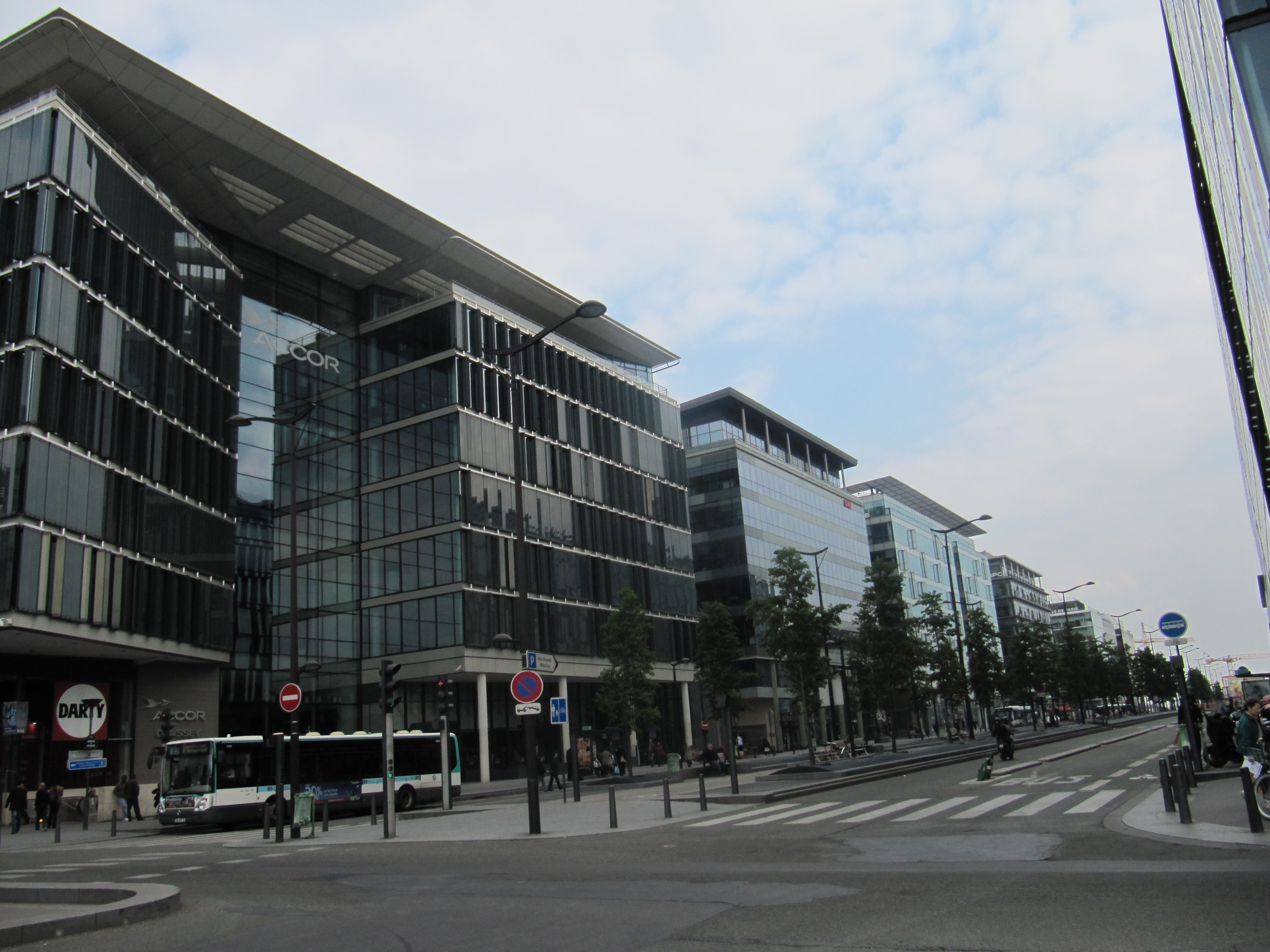
Avenue de France

Paris Rive Gauche (French pronunciation: [paʁi ʁiv ɡoʃ]) is a new neighbourhood in the 13th arrondissement of Paris, on the left bank of the Seine. The district is bordered by the Seine, the railway tracks of Gare d'Austerlitz and the Boulevard Périphérique. This 130 ha plot of land has 10 ha of green spaces and 2,000 trees. Paris Rive Gauche is divided into three districts along the Seine: Austerlitz, Tolbiac and Massena (from North to South).

Paris Rive Gauche is a dense, compact, multi-faceted, mixed income neighbourhood rich in public transport and permissible to cyclists and pedestrians. With construction starting in 1995, Paris Rive Gauche was built around former railway yards, warehouses, and industrial businesses. It has been cited as a model of quality urban design and planning integration with sustainable transport.

The vast Bibliothèque nationale de France and one of the campuses of the University of Paris are located in this area, along the river.

The development accommodates approximately 15,000 residents, 30,000 students and university staff and 50,000 employees. It is served by the Métro and RER stations Bibliothèque François Mitterrand, Line 3A at the stop Avenue de France, and Paris Métro station Quai de la Gare.
