= Hôtel de Ville, Cannes =

Town hall in Cannes, France

Hôtel de Ville
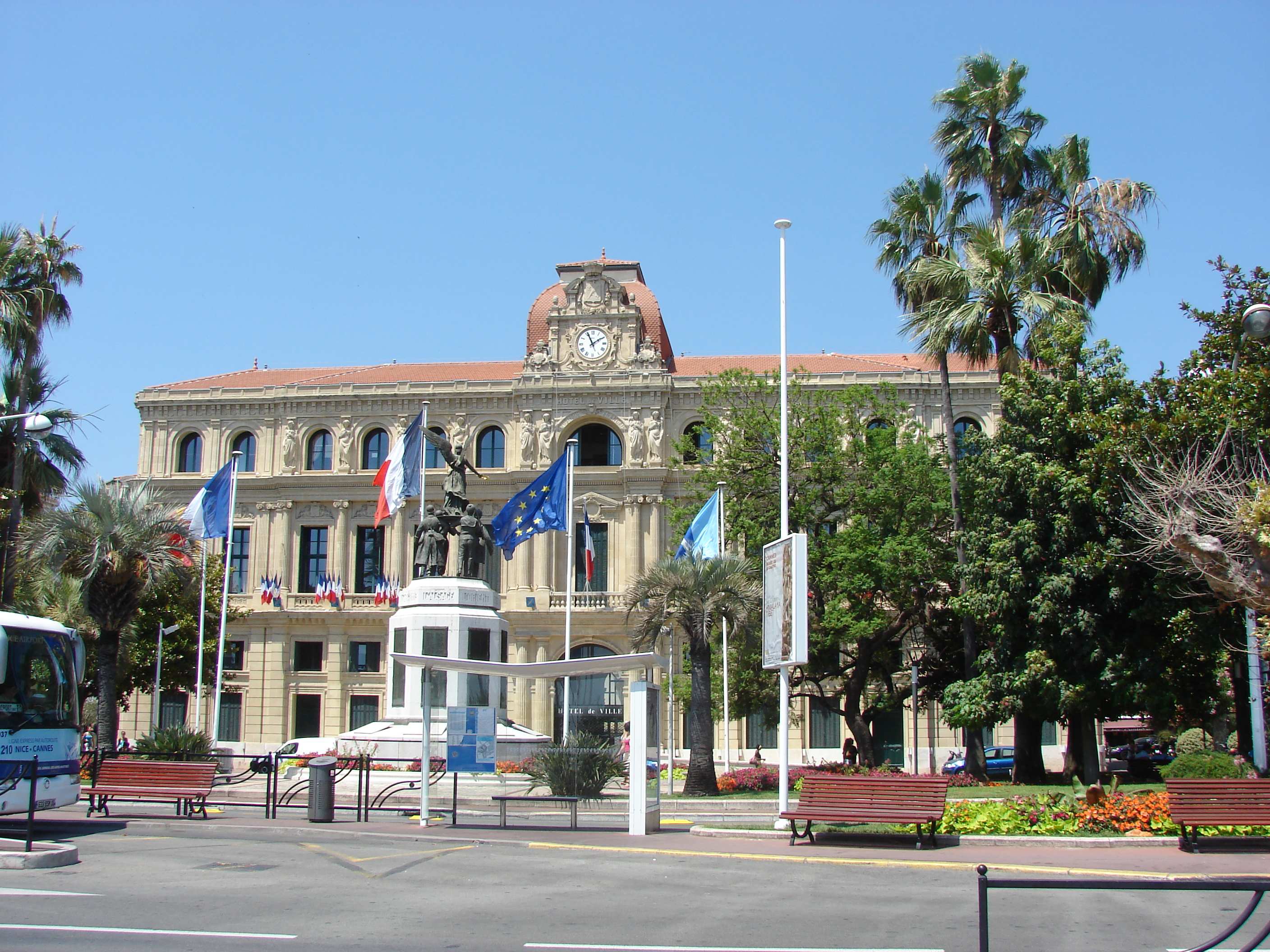
- The main frontage of the Hôtel de Ville in July 2010
- Interactive map of the Hôtel de Ville area

General information
- Type: City hall
- Architectural style: Neoclassical style
- Location: Cannes, France
- Coordinates: 43.5514°N 7.0126°E
- Completed: 1876

Design and construction
- Architect: Louis Hourlier

The Hôtel de Ville (French pronunciation: [otɛl də vil], City Hall) is a municipal building in Cannes, Alpes-Maritimes, southern France, standing on Allées de la Liberté. It has been included on the Inventaire général des monuments by the French Ministry of Culture since 1983.

== History ==
The first town hall in Cannes was close to Saint Anne Chapel in the Le Suquet district of the town. The council relocated to the Bâtiment de la Boucherie (Butcher's Building) close to the L'école des Beaux-Arts (School of Fine Art) in 1515. Following the French Revolution, the council rented offices from Compte Pierre Joseph Rostan d'Ancezune and others, remaining there for nearly a century. In the mid-19th century, the council decided to commission a dedicated town hall. The site they selected was at the western end of the Allées de la Liberté, close to the sea front.

Construction of the new building started in 1874. The building was designed by Louis Hourlier in the neoclassical style, built in ashlar stone and was completed in 1876. The design involved a symmetrical main frontage of 13 bays facing onto the Allées de la Liberté. The central bay featured a round headed opening flanked by two pairs of Doric order columns supporting a cornice and a balcony. There was a French door with a moulded surround and a triangular pediment, flanked by Ionic order columns supporting a modillioned cornice, on the first floor, and there was a Diocletian window, flanked by two pairs of caryatids supporting a modillion cornice, on the second floor. The central bay was surmounted by a clock, which was surrounded by ornate carvings and topped by a heraldic shield and a crown. The other bays were fenestrated by casement windows on all floors, the windows on the second floor being round headed. The bays were flanked by Doric order pilasters spanning the ground and mezzanine floors, ionic order columns on the first floor and caryatids on the second floor.

Internally, the principal room was the Salle du Conseil (council chamber). There was also the Musée Alphonse de Rothschild (Museum Alphonse de Rothschild), (Note: The museum was established with support from Alphonse James de Rothschild, whose mother, Betty von Rothschild lived at Villa Rothschild in Cannes.) the Musée d'Histoire Naturelle (Natural History Museum) and a library with 37,000 volumes, many of them of regional importance.

A syndicat d'initiative (tourist information centre) was established in the building in 1907. A monument, in the form of group of one airman, two soldiers and a sailor, cast in bronze, which was designed by the sculptor, Albert Cheuret, and intended to commemorate the lives of local service personnel who died in the First World War was unveiled in front of the town hall in November 1927. The Musée Alphonse de Rothschild (Museum Alphonse de Rothschild) closed in 1939, and the Musée d'Histoire Naturelle (Natural History Museum) closed in 1941. The town hall suffered extensive damage from gunfire from the cruiser USS Nashville on 16 August 1944, shortly before the liberation of the town on 24 August 1944, during the Second World War.

There was a serious fire in the building, caused by a fault in an electrical panel, in June 2021. Repair work took over four months to complete and cost €3 million.
