= Midem =

Annual music trade show in France, since 1967

- Status: Active
- Genre: Trade fair
- Frequency: Annual
- Venue: Palais des Festivals et des Congrès, Cannes
- Country: France
- Years active: since 1967
- Previous event: 29 January 2025 - 31 January 2025
- Next event: 4 February 2026 – 7 February 2026
- Area: world
- Organiser: Live Nation/City of Cannes
- Website: midem.com

Midem is the acronym for Marché International du Disque et de l'Édition Musicale, which is organised annually in and around the Palais des Festivals et des Congrès in Cannes, France. The trade show began in 1967, organised by Reed MIDEM, a subsidiary of Reed Exhibitions. It is billed as the leading international business event for the music ecosystem. Several thousand musicians, producers, agents, managers, lawyers, executives, entrepreneurs and journalists from around the globe regularly attend the event, which is usually held at the end of January or early February. While delegates from recording, artist management, and publishers network, new artists showcase their material. Live music is presented in the evenings.

The event is developing like the industry, focused on the core music business (labels, publishers, rights societies and more), the technology sector (startups, developers and big tech companies), brands, and the agencies that represent them (for music and brand campaigns). Since 2007, the Midemlab competition for companies working in musictech has grown in importance. SoundCloud, Spotify and Songkick are among the companies that have risen to prominence after showcasing there.

In December 2021, RX France (the organisers of Midem) announced that they were cancelling the 2022 edition. A statement on their website stated simply, "Due to the lasting pandemic and following a review of its activity, RX France has decided to no longer continue to organize the Midem event." In a separate communication, Midem Director Alexandre Deniot announced that RX France and the city of Cannes were in "exclusive and advanced discussions for the latter to take over the Midem brand".

In 2023 and 2024, smaller editions were held. In late 2024, the City of Cannes announced a new partnership between Cannes, the Palais des Festivals and Live Nation for the 2025 edition "with the ambition to make MIDEM 2025 the global crossroads of the music industry".

== Business role ==
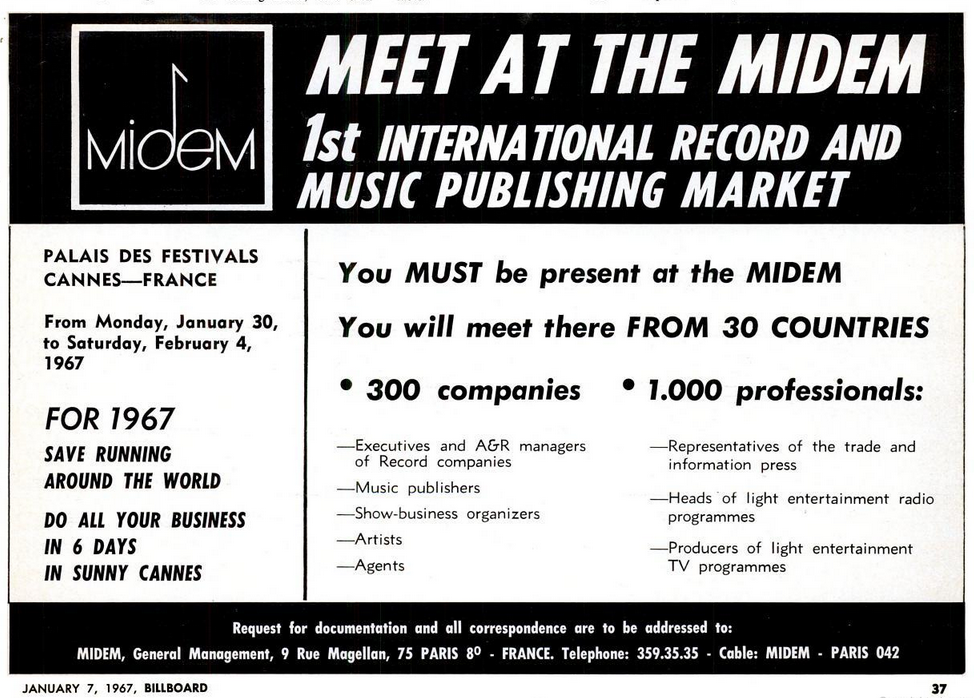
1st edition MIDEM trade advertisement, Billboard 7 January 1967

Midem provides a forum for business talks, political and legal discussions. It is a market where global distribution and music deals are sealed. It also is a platform for showcasing new artists, musical trends and music-related products and services. So-called musictech, or music technology services, has featured more prominently over later years.

== Attendance ==
In January 2013, Midem was attended by 6,400 delegates from 3,000 companies (out of which 1,350 had stands or pavilions of their own). The event was covered by 350 international journalists. Although there are attendees from all over the world, the majority of delegates have been from Western Europe and North America. In 2015 many more international delegates registered.

In 2020 and again in 2021, the event went entirely online due to COVID-19 restrictions. Not only was the south of France still undergoing curfews and restrictions, it was felt that many international participants would not be able to reach Cannes, and major companies would be reticent about sending employees into a potentially infectious environment. As of March 2021 Midem promised to be back in Cannes in June 2022 but the 2022 event was canceled by its December 2021 announcement.

== Ceremony awards ==
The conference has held some ceremonies awards, including Midem Videoclips Awards in the 1980s, compiled by Music Box and Eurotipsheet. Midem held Man of the Year honorary dinners. In 1998, Ahmet Ertegun was honoured. Peter Gabriel received Personality of the Year in 2007. Prebilled as an "international" competition, it recognized videos of European, US and English-speaking artists. The record companies submitted their videos for competition.

In 1992, it was created the International Visual Music Awards, in association with SACEM (the French society for authors, composers, and publishers of music). In 1994, Billboard reported the ceremony was simply called the MIDEM Awards. In 2000, the MidemNet Award was created. Other ceremonies includes International Classical Music Awards, and the Cannes Classical Awards.
