= Palais des Festivals et des Congrès =

Convention centre in Cannes, France

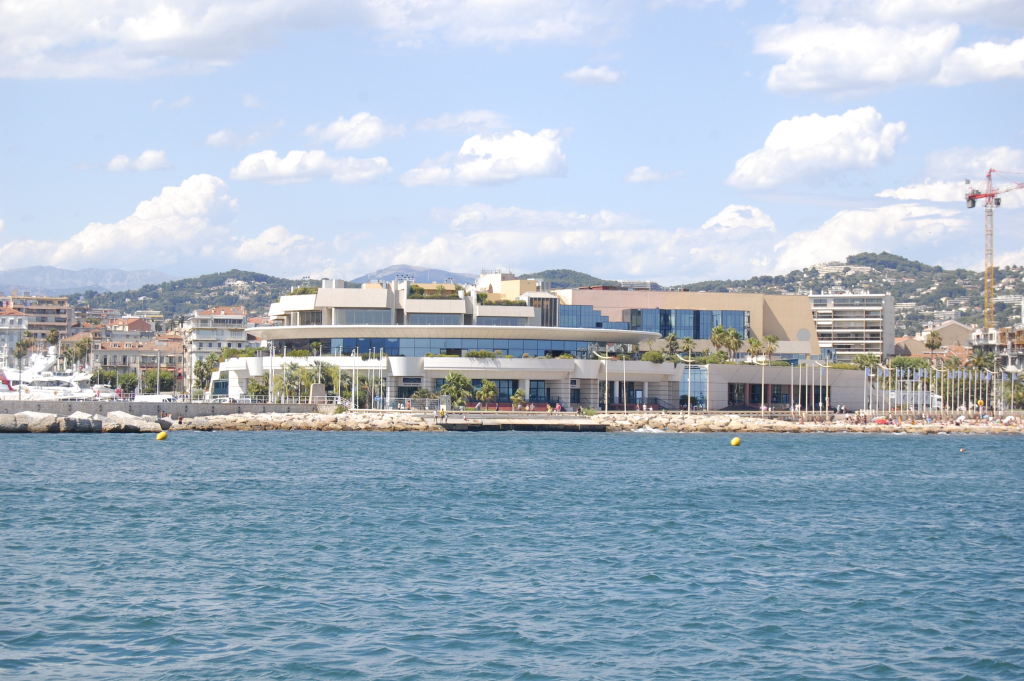
- Interactive map of Palais des Festivals et des Congrès
- Location: Cannes, France
- Coordinates: 43°33′03.10″N 7°01′02.10″E
- Operator: SEMEC

Construction
- Built: 1949
- Opened: 1949 (first building); 15 December 1982 (second building)
- Expanded: 1999
- Architect: Sir Hubert Bennett and François Druet (second building)

Tenants
- Cannes Film Festival; Cannes Lions International Festival of Creativity

Website
- www.palaisdesfestivals.com

The Palais des Festivals et des Congrès (French pronunciation: [palɛ de fɛstival e de kɔ̃ɡʁɛ], Palace of Festivals and Conferences) is a convention centre in Cannes, France. It is the primary venue for the annual Cannes Film Festival, the Cannes Lions International Festival of Creativity, MIPIM, and the NRJ Music Awards. The second building was unveiled in 1982.

== History ==
The first Palais des Festivals et des Congrès was built in 1949 to host the Cannes Film Festival. The original building was located on the boulevard of Promenade de la Croisette, on the present site of the JW Marriott Cannes. That building previously hosted the 4th and 6th Eurovision Song Contests in 1959 and 1961, respectively.

In response to the growing success of the Film Festival and the advent of the first business conventions (such as the MIPTV Media Market in 1965), the City of Cannes decided to build a new Palais in 1979. The new building, a six-story structure designed in the modernist style by the architects Sir Hubert Bennett and François Druet, was constructed on the site of the municipal casino. It opened in December 1982, and was expanded in 1999 with the construction of the Espace Riviera, a new space of 10,000 square metres.

In January 1992, the Society of Mixed Economy for the Events of the City of Cannes (SEMEC) was created to oversee the Palais. SEMEC was formed from the merger of three non-profit organizations: Cannes Tourism, the OMACC and the association Cannes Palais des Festivals et des Congrès.

== Status ==
The Palais des Festivals is located at the top of Blvd. de la Croisette, east of the port. The venue has an overall area of 35,000 square metres, primarily for exhibitions, as well as numerous rooms plus 18 auditoriums (the largest of which has a capacity of 2,300). It is the venue for the annual Cannes Film Festival (Festival de Cannes), and possesses "modern and high-tech facilities" for housing conferences throughout the year.

== Media ==
- Institut National de l'Audiovisuel: Construction of the Palais des festivals (1947) (commentary in French)

Preceded by AVRO Studios; Hilversum	Eurovision Song Contest; Venue; 1959	Succeeded by Royal Festival Hall; London
Preceded by Royal Festival Hall; London	Eurovision Song Contest; Venue; 1961	Succeeded by Villa Louvigny; Luxembourg City
