= Le Suquet =

Quarter in Cannes

Coordinates: 43°33′03″N 7°00′42″E

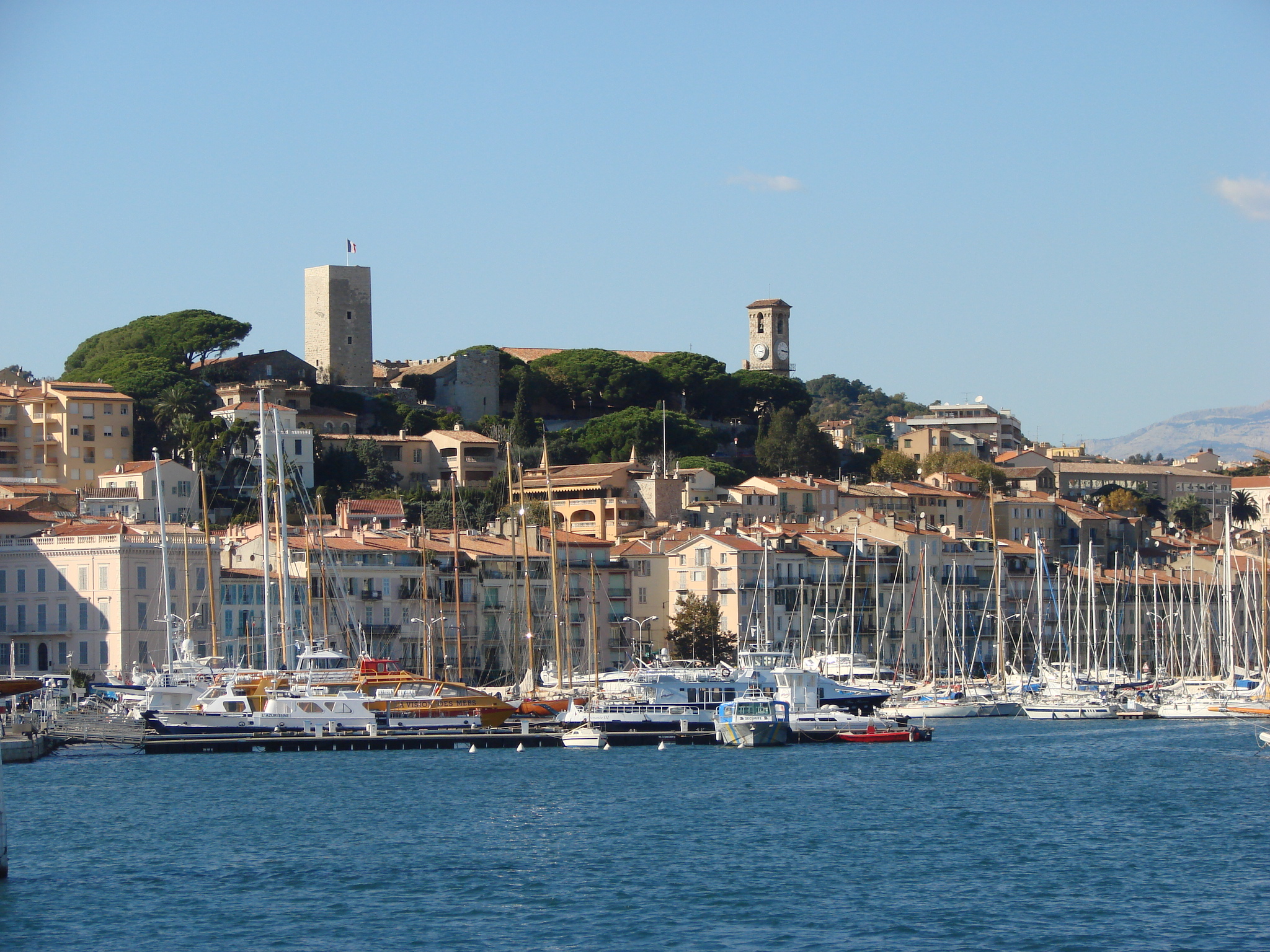
Le Suquet, seen above the port

Le Suquet (French pronunciation: [lə sykɛ]) is the old quarter of Cannes, probably best known to tourists as the climbing, winding cobbled lane lined with local restaurants, Rue St Antoine. Le Suquet contains a clock tower and church that sit high facing east overlooking the Bay of Cannes and Cannes itself. At the bottom of Le Suquet on Rue Dr. P. Gazagnaire is the Marché Forville, where the market is held in the mornings and early afternoon.

This area is the original fishermen residential area of Cannes. The houses are all very old. The streets were laid out at least 400 years ago. It is a 5-minute walk from the beach and is full of restaurants around the Rue Saint Antoine and the Rue du Suquet. A lot of the area is pedestrianised and is a major tourist attraction for visitors to Cannes.

The rue du Suquet is the original main road into Cannes. It came in below the walls of the castle (for defence reasons). It is a pedestrian zone and has plenty of restaurants.

== See also ==
- Promenade de la Croisette
