= Claude Mercier-Ythier =

French harpsichord manufacturer (1931–2020)

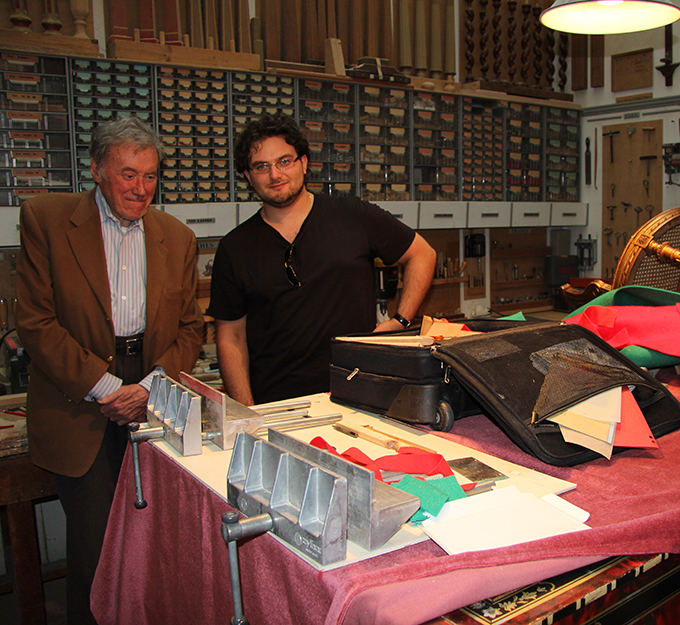
- Claude Mercier-Ythier (left) with Francesco Mazzoli in Paris in 2013
- Born: 1931; Cannes, France
- Died: 3 July 2020 (aged 88–89)
- Occupation: Harpsichord maker

Claude Mercier-Ythier (1931 – 3 July 2020) was a French harpsichord maker who ran a shop and workshop in Paris dedicated exclusively to harpsichords. Instruments that he built and restored have been played in many concerts and recordings, including a recording of Bach's complete keyboard works by Zuzana Růžičková. He wrote a standard book on the topic, Les clavecins, published in 1990.

== Life ==
Mercier-Ythier was born into a family of cabinetmakers and engineers. He was passionate about music from a young age and at the age of 18 built his first harpsichord in his garage alongside his friends. After studies at the Conservatoire de Toulon, he went to Bavaria to work with Kurt Wittmayer, where he perfected his skills. He also worked for Neupert and Pleyel et Cie.

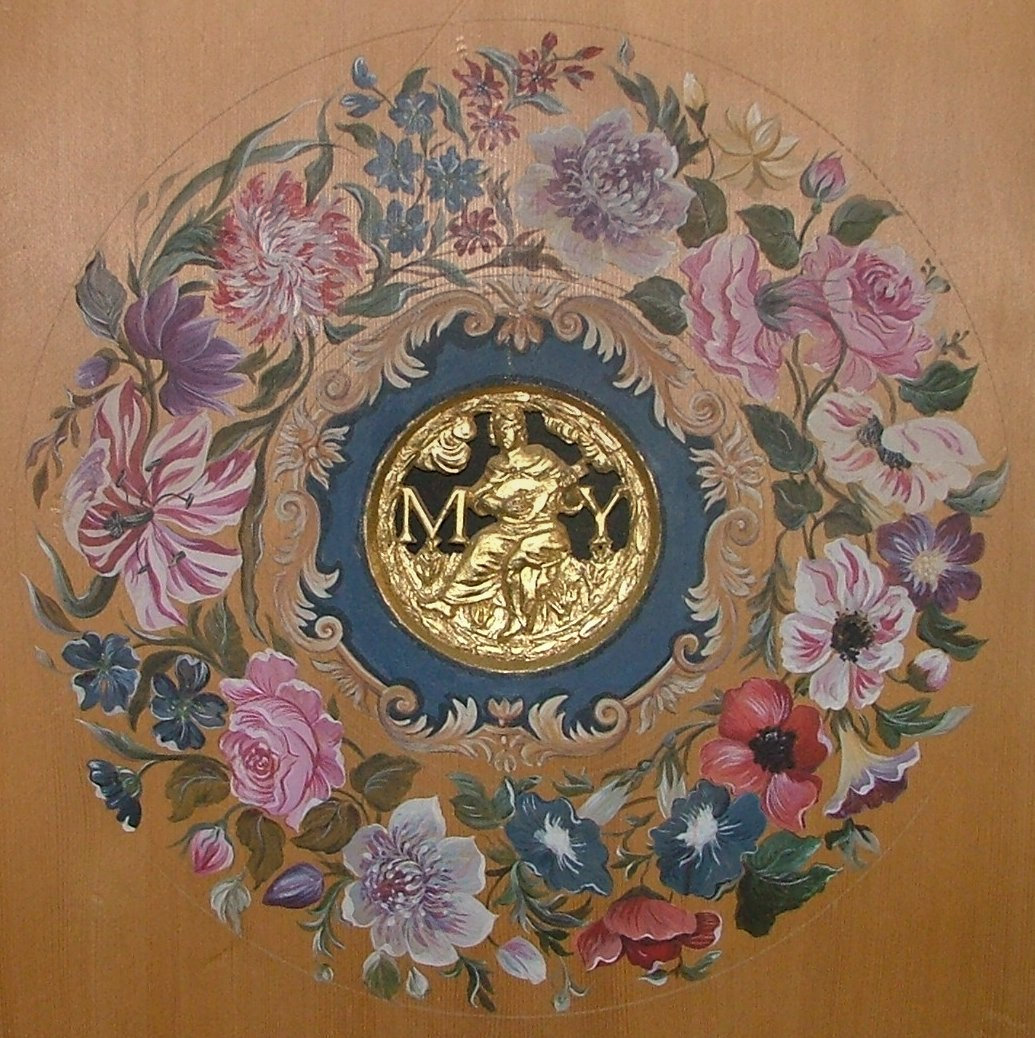
Rose on a harpsichord by Claude Mercier Ythier

In 1962, Mercier-Ythier opened his first workshop in Paris, specializing in the production of harpsichords. He was the first Frenchman since the reign of Louis XVI to specialize solely in harpsichord production. Mercier-Ythier diversified his business, catering his harpsichords to businesses, theatres, and concert halls. The instruments have also appeared in over 50 films, including L'Allée du Roi and Brotherhood of the Wolf. After a 45-year career, Mercier-Ythier's harpsichords had appeared in over 9000 concerts and 700 recordings.

The historic instruments that he had restored were used in concert and for recordings, such as a 2-manual harpsichord by Jean-Henri Hemsch built in Paris in 1755/56, played for Bach's The Well-Tempered Clavier, Book II, by Helmut Walcha in 1974. He prepared the instrument for Bach's complete keyboard works played by Zuzana Růžičková.

In 1990, he published a book about harpsichord making history and technique, Les Clavecins, which is cited in other books about the topic such as The Historical Harpsichord and The Harpsichord and Clavichord: An Encyclopedia edited by Igor Kipnis. The book is also referenced in Howard Schott's overview "Early Keyboard Instruments" published in Revue de Musicologie in 1993.

Mercier-Ythier died on 3 July 2020.

== Publication ==
- Les clavecins, Editions Vecteurs, 1990, 978-0-94-519375-3
