= JW Marriott Cannes =

Hotel in Cannes, France

Coordinates: 43.5499°N 7.02535°E

- Exterior of the JW Marriott Cannes
- Interactive map of JW Marriott Cannes
- Location: Cannes, France
- Opened: 1992
- No. of rooms: 262
- Casino type: Casino hotel
- Operating license holder: Marriott International
- Website: https://www.marriott.com/hotels/travel/ncejw-jw-marriott-cannes/

The JW Marriott Cannes is a five star hotel on the Croisette in Cannes. It was built in 1992 as the Noga Hilton by hotel magnate Nessim Gaon, and was renamed the Palais Stéphanie in 2007 when it passed from Hilton to Accor. It was renamed again in 2011, becoming a JW Marriott. It is located between the Carlton, Le Martinez and Le Majestic. In 1993, Steelman Partners designed the casino located in the hotel. The casino was known as Casino Riviera.

== Gallery ==
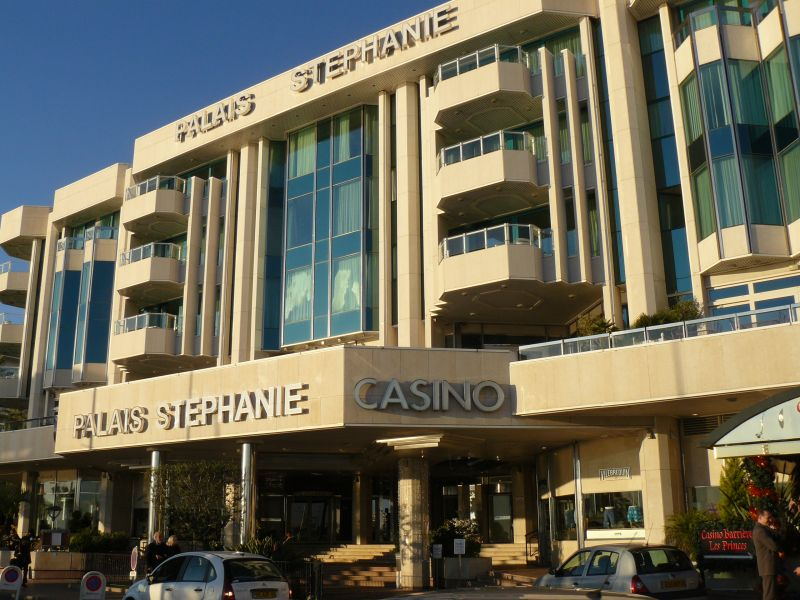
The hotel in 2008

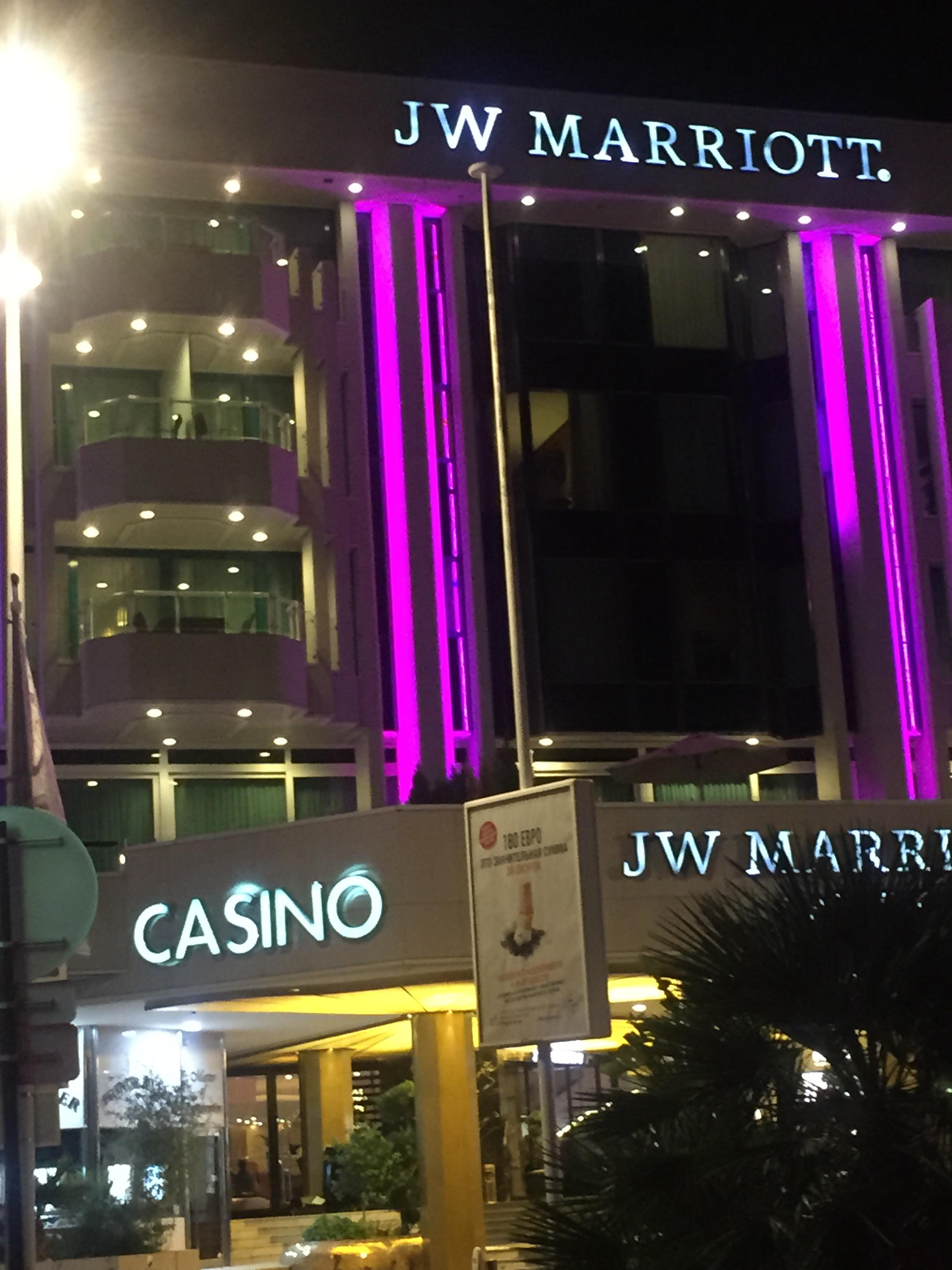
The hotel at night

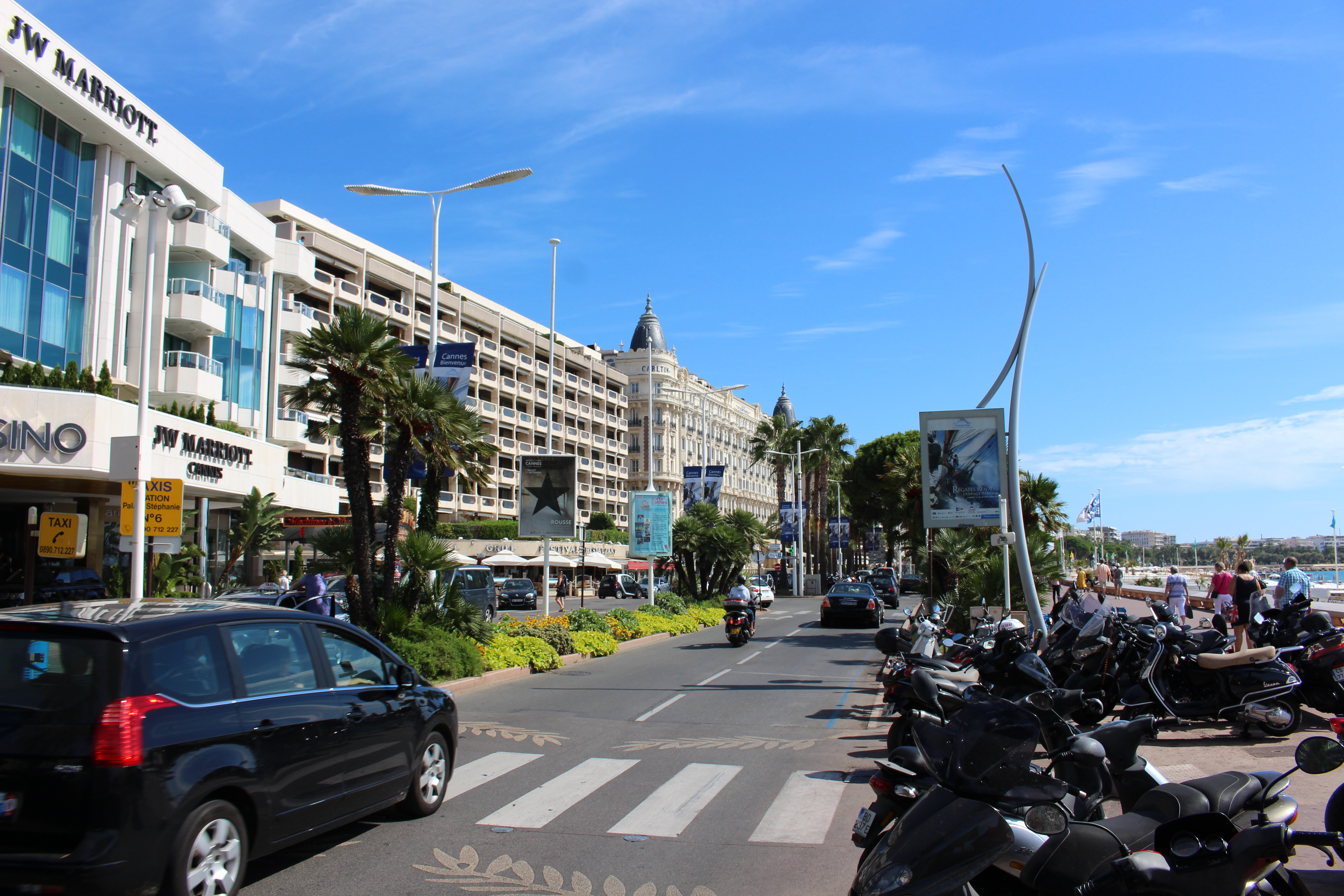
The hotel and the Promenade de la Croisette
