= Cannes =

City in Provence-Alpes-Côte d'Azur, France

Cannes Canas (Occitan)
- Commune
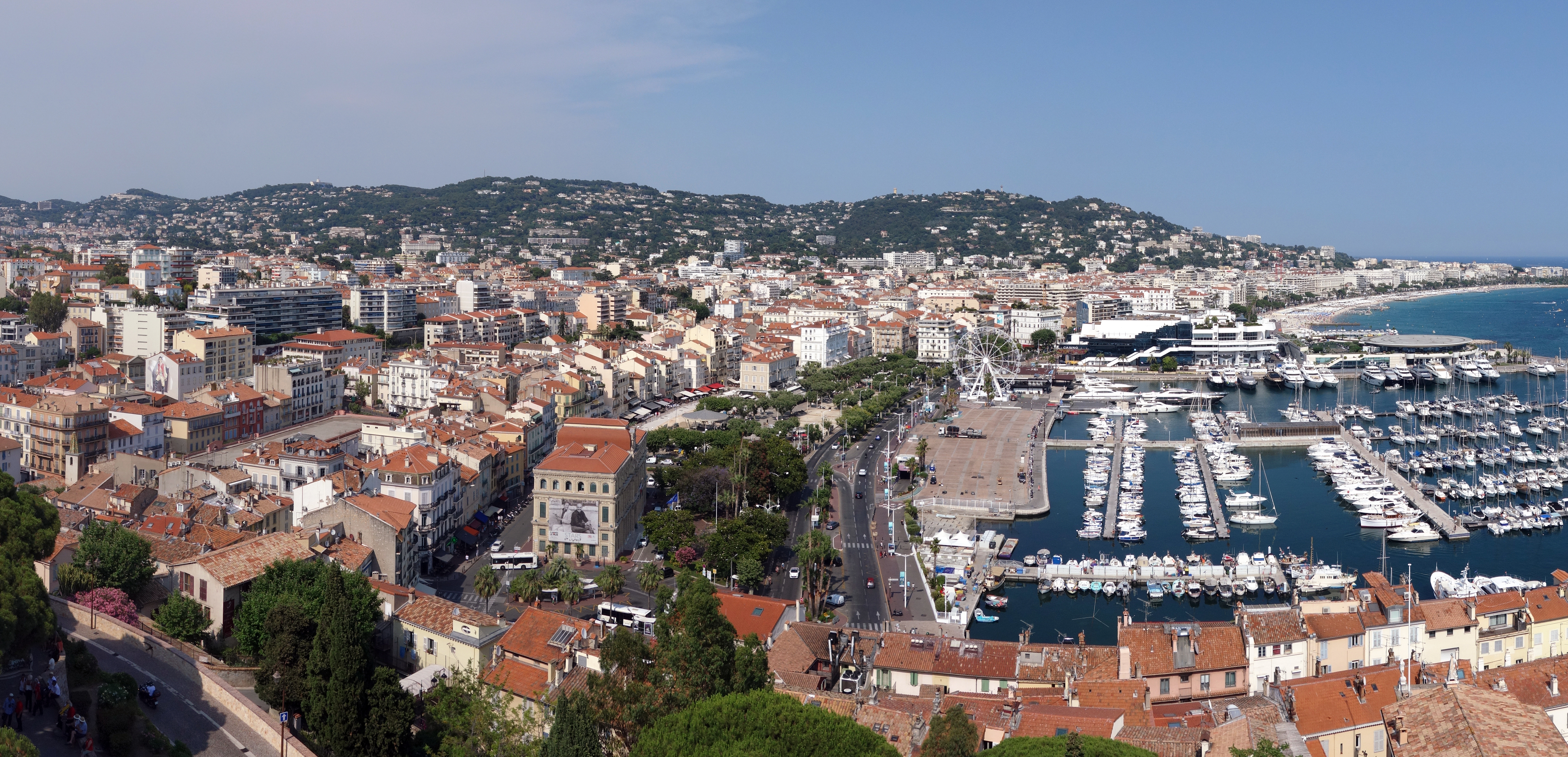
- A view of Cannes

- Flag Coat of arms
- Location of Cannes
- Location within France Location within Provence-Alpes-Côte d'Azur
- Coordinates: 43°33′05″N 7°00′46″E
- Country: France
- Region: Provence-Alpes-Côte d'Azur
- Department: Alpes-Maritimes
- Arrondissement: Grasse
- Canton: Cannes-1 and 2
- Intercommunality: CA Cannes Pays de Lérins

Government
  - Mayor (2026–32): David Lisnard (NÉ)
- Area^{1}: 19.62 km^{2} (7.58 sq mi)
- Highest elevation: 260 m (850 ft)
- Lowest elevation: 0 m (0 ft)
- Population (2023): 74,350
  - Density: 3,790/km^{2} (9,815/sq mi)
- Demonym(s): Cannois (masculine); Cannoise (feminine)
- Time zone: UTC+01:00 (CET)
  - Summer (DST): UTC+02:00 (CEST)
- INSEE/Postal code: 06029 /06400
- ^{1} French Land Register data, which excludes lakes, ponds, glaciers > 1 km^{2} (0.386 sq mi or 247 acres) and river estuaries.

Cannes (Note: /kæn, kɑːn/ KA(H)N; French: [kan], locally [ˈkanə]; Occitan: Canas [ˈkanɔs].) is a resort city located on the French Riviera. It is located in the Alpes-Maritimes department of Provence-Alpes-Côte d'Azur, and is the host city of the annual Cannes Film Festival, Midem, and Cannes Lions International Festival of Creativity. The city is known for its association with the rich and famous, its luxury hotels and restaurants, and for several conferences.

== History ==
By the 2nd century BC, the Ligurian Oxybii established a settlement here known as Aegitna (Ancient Greek: Αἴγιτνα). Historians are unsure what the name means, but the connection to Greek αἴγες "waves, surf" seems evident. The second element could be compared to the Cretan and Thessalian towns of Itanos (Ἴτανος) and Iton (Ἴτων); also phonetically close is the Aetolian town of Aegitium (Αἰγίτιον). The area was a fishing village used as a port of call between the Lérins Islands.

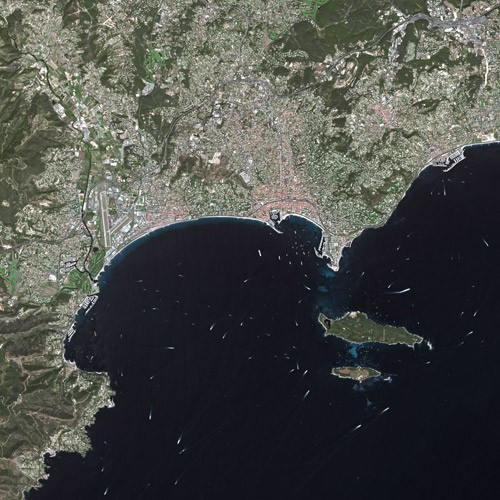
Cannes seen from Spot Satellite

In 154 BC, it became the scene of violent but short-lived conflict between the troops of Quintus Opimius and the Oxybii.

In the 10th century, the town was known as Canua. The name may derive from "canna", a reed. Canua was probably the site of a small Ligurian port, and later a Roman outpost on Le Suquet hill, suggested by Roman tombs discovered here. Le Suquet housed an 11th-century tower, which overlooked the swamps where the city now stands. Most of the ancient activity, especially protection, was on the Lérins Islands, and the history of Cannes is closely tied to the history of the islands.

An attack in 891 by the Saracens, who remained until the end of the 10th century, devastated the country around Canua. The insecurity of the Lérins islands forced the monks to settle on the mainland, at the Suquet. Construction of a castle in 1035 fortified the city then known as Cannes, and at the end of the 11th century construction was started on two towers on the Lérins islands. One took a century to build.

Around 1530, Cannes detached from the monks who had controlled the city for hundreds of years and became independent.

During the 18th century, both the Spanish and British tried to gain control of the Lérins Islands but were chased away by the French. The islands were later controlled by many, such as Jean-Honoré Alziary and the Bishop of Fréjus. They had many different purposes: in the middle of the 19th century, one served as a hospital for soldiers wounded in the Crimean War.

Henry Brougham, 1st Baron Brougham and Vaux bought land at the Croix des Gardes "about the year 1838, when it was little more than a fishing village on a picturesque coast" and constructed the Villa Eleonore-Louise; Brougham's work to improve living conditions attracted the English aristocracy, who also built winter residences.

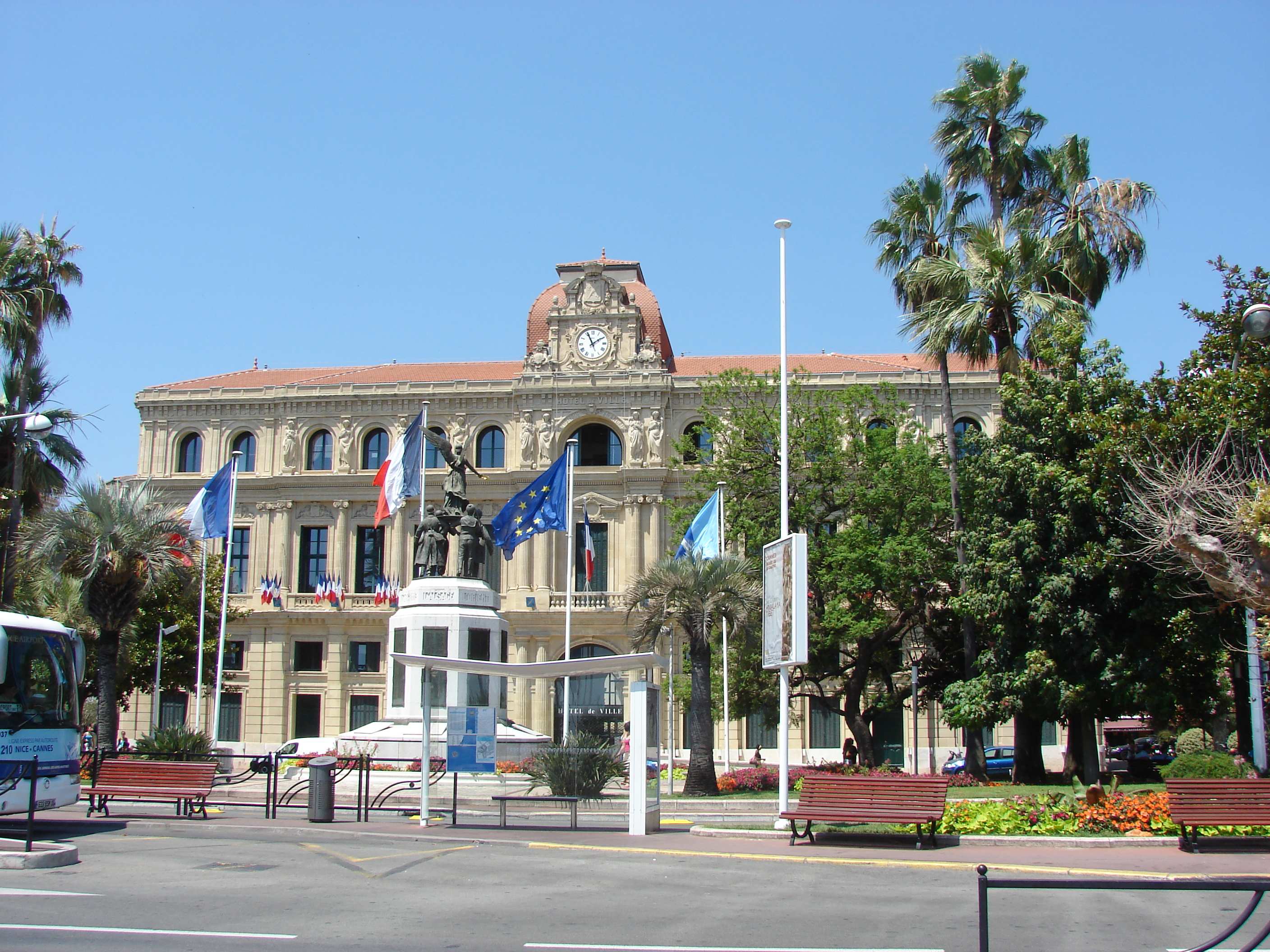
The Hôtel de Ville

The 19th century saw the modernization of Cannes, spearheaded by Marie de Lametz and her son, Prince Charles III, to follow the successes of nearby Nice and the successful gambling industry in Bad Homburg. After several failures in the 1850s, the late 1860s saw an expansion of casino, villas, hotels, roads and railway; the travelling time from Paris to Cannes reduced to 23 hours. The Hôtel de Ville was completed in 1876.

During the repression of January and February 1894, the police conducted raids targeting the anarchists living there, without much success.

At the end of the 19th century, several more railways were completed, which prompted the arrival of streetcars. In Cannes, projects such as the Boulevard Carnot and the rue d'Antibes were carried out. After the closure of the Casino des Fleurs (hôtel Gallia), a luxury establishment was built for the rich winter clientele, the Casino Municipal next to the pier Albert-Edouard. This casino was demolished and replaced by the new Palace in 1979.

In the 20th century, new luxury hotels such as the Carlton, Majestic, Martinez, and JW Marriott Cannes were built. The city was modernised with a sports centre, a post office, and schools. There were fewer British and German tourists after the First World War, but more Americans. Winter tourism gave way to summer tourism, and the summer casino at Palm Beach was constructed.

In 1931, Karan Singh, the crown prince of Jammu and Kashmir, was born at the Martinez Hotel.

The city council had the idea of starting an international film festival shortly after World War II.

On 3 November 2011, it hosted the 2011 G20 summit.

In 2021, Cannes was designated as the City of Film by the UNESCO Creative Cities Network.

== Climate ==
Cannes has a subtropical Mediterranean climate (Köppen climate classification Csa) and the city enjoys 11 hours of sunshine per day during summer (July), while in winter (December to February) the weather is mild. Both seasons see a relatively low rainfall and most rain occurs during October and November when over 100 mm (3.9 in) falls.

Cannes summers are long and warm, with summer daytime temperatures regularly hitting 30 °C (86 °F), while average temperatures are about 25 °C (77 °F). Temperatures remain high from June to September, the busiest time of the year.

Mean temperatures drop below 10 °C (50 °F) for only three months of the year (December to February). The spring and autumn are also warm, although more suited to those who prefer slightly cooler weather.

The record high temperature was 39.2 °C (102.6 °F) on 19 July 2023, while the record low temperature was −12.0 °C (10.4 °F) on 9 January 1985.

Climate data for Cannes (1991–2020 normals, extremes 1949–present)
Month	Jan	Feb	Mar	Apr	May	Jun	Jul	Aug	Sep	Oct	Nov	Dec	Year
Record high °C (°F)	22.9 (73.2)	26.0 (78.8)	27.9 (82.2)	27.6 (81.7)	31.7 (89.1)	37.3 (99.1)	39.2 (102.6)	38.3 (100.9)	35.0 (95.0)	31.4 (88.5)	25.8 (78.4)	23.8 (74.8)	39.2 (102.6)
Mean daily maximum °C (°F)	13.6 (56.5)	13.9 (57.0)	16.0 (60.8)	18.2 (64.8)	21.9 (71.4)	25.5 (77.9)	28.2 (82.8)	28.6 (83.5)	25.3 (77.5)	21.3 (70.3)	17.1 (62.8)	14.3 (57.7)	20.3 (68.6)
Daily mean °C (°F)	8.6 (47.5)	8.8 (47.8)	11.0 (51.8)	13.5 (56.3)	17.2 (63.0)	20.9 (69.6)	23.5 (74.3)	23.7 (74.7)	20.3 (68.5)	16.7 (62.1)	12.5 (54.5)	9.4 (48.9)	15.5 (59.9)
Mean daily minimum °C (°F)	3.7 (38.7)	3.7 (38.7)	6.0 (42.8)	8.7 (47.7)	12.6 (54.7)	16.3 (61.3)	18.7 (65.7)	18.8 (65.8)	15.4 (59.7)	12.1 (53.8)	7.9 (46.2)	4.6 (40.3)	10.7 (51.3)
Record low °C (°F)	−12.0 (10.4)	−9.2 (15.4)	−9.9 (14.2)	−0.5 (31.1)	2.3 (36.1)	7.4 (45.3)	8.8 (47.8)	10.5 (50.9)	5.3 (41.5)	0.9 (33.6)	−3.4 (25.9)	−5.6 (21.9)	−12.0 (10.4)
Average precipitation mm (inches)	82.5 (3.25)	57.0 (2.24)	60.2 (2.37)	78.2 (3.08)	51.8 (2.04)	32.5 (1.28)	18.7 (0.74)	23.9 (0.94)	92.1 (3.63)	134.3 (5.29)	145.4 (5.72)	104.6 (4.12)	881.2 (34.7)
Average precipitation days (≥ 1.0 mm)	5.9	5.3	5.7	6.3	5.4	3.6	1.8	2.7	4.8	7.5	8.5	6.4	63.9
Average relative humidity (%)	72	70	70	70	73	74	72	72	74	75	74	72	72.3
Mean monthly sunshine hours	148.1	164.0	216.7	227.3	274.6	312.5	346.5	320.1	254.2	192.7	149.6	136.5	2,742.7
Source 1: Meteociel
Source 2: Infoclimat.fr (humidity 1961–1990)

== Population ==
Historical population

Year	Pop.	±% p.a.
1793	2,626	—
1800	2,896	+1.41%
1806	2,804	−0.54%
1821	3,982	+2.37%
1831	3,994	+0.03%
1836	3,997	+0.02%
1841	3,381	−3.29%
1846	4,720	+6.90%
1851	5,557	+3.32%
1856	5,860	+1.07%
1861	7,557	+5.22%
1866	9,618	+4.94%
1872	10,144	+0.89%
1876	14,022	+8.43%
1881	19,385	+6.69%
1886	19,959	+0.59%
1891	19,983	+0.02%
1896	22,959	+2.82%
1901	30,420	+5.79%

Year	Pop.	±% p.a.
1906	29,365	−0.70%
1911	29,656	+0.20%
1921	30,907	+0.41%
1926	42,427	+6.54%
1931	47,259	+2.18%
1936	49,032	+0.74%
1946	45,548	−0.73%
1954	50,192	+1.22%
1962	58,079	+1.84%
1968	67,152	+2.45%
1975	70,527	+0.70%
1982	72,259	+0.35%
1990	68,676	−0.63%
1999	67,304	−0.22%
2007	70,829	+0.64%
2012	73,603	+0.77%
2017	73,868	+0.07%
2023	74,350	+0.11%

Source: EHESS and INSEE (1968–2023)

== Landmarks ==
The Promenade de la Croisette is the waterfront avenue with palm trees. La Croisette is known for picturesque beaches, restaurants, cafés, boutiques, and luxury hotels. Le Suquet, the old town, provides a good view of La Croisette. The fortified tower and the Chapelle Sainte-Anne house the Musée des Explorations du monde. A distinctive building in Cannes is the Russian Orthodox church.

=== Hotels ===
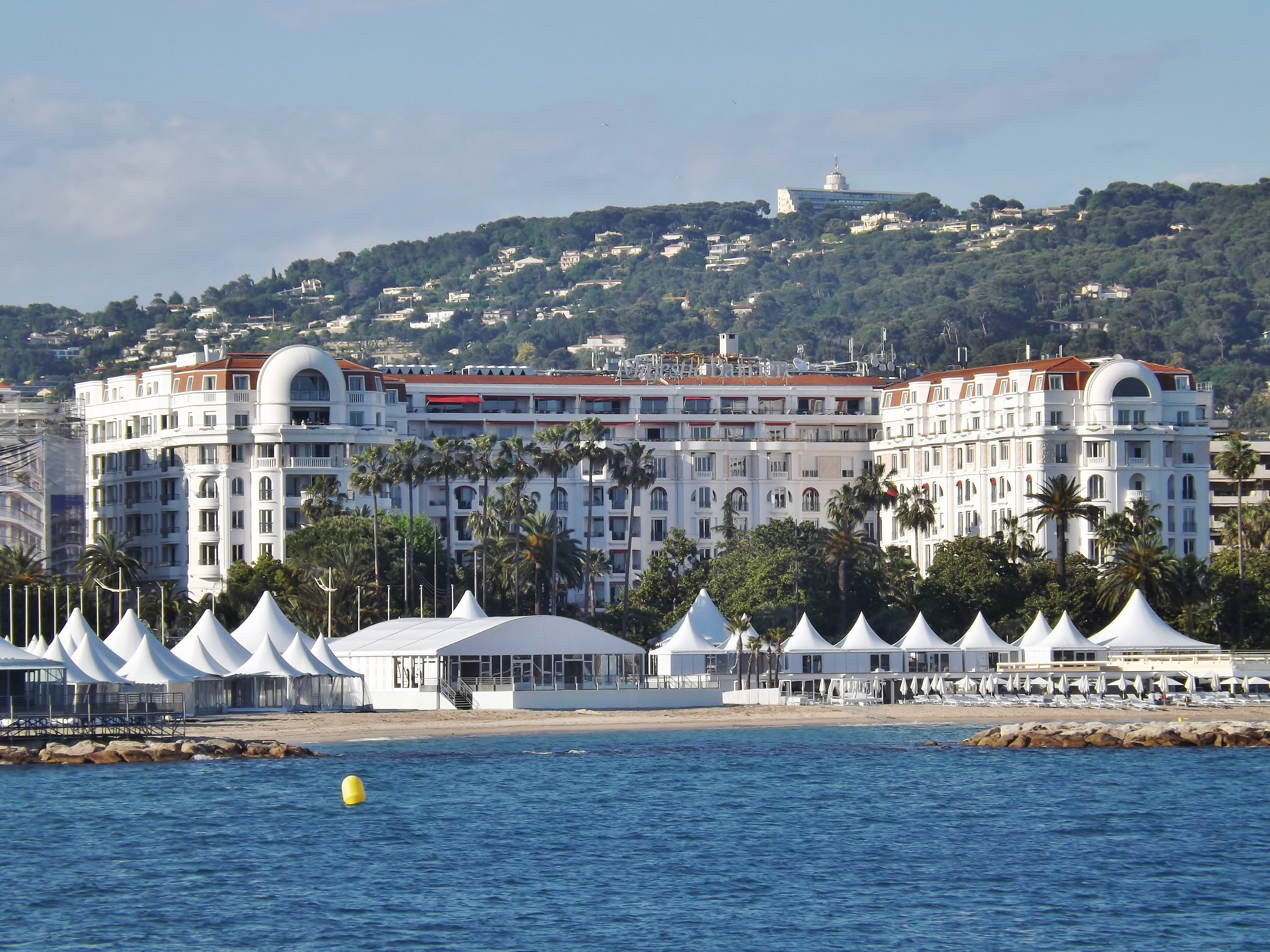
Hotel Barrière Le Majestic Cannes

Hôtel Martinez

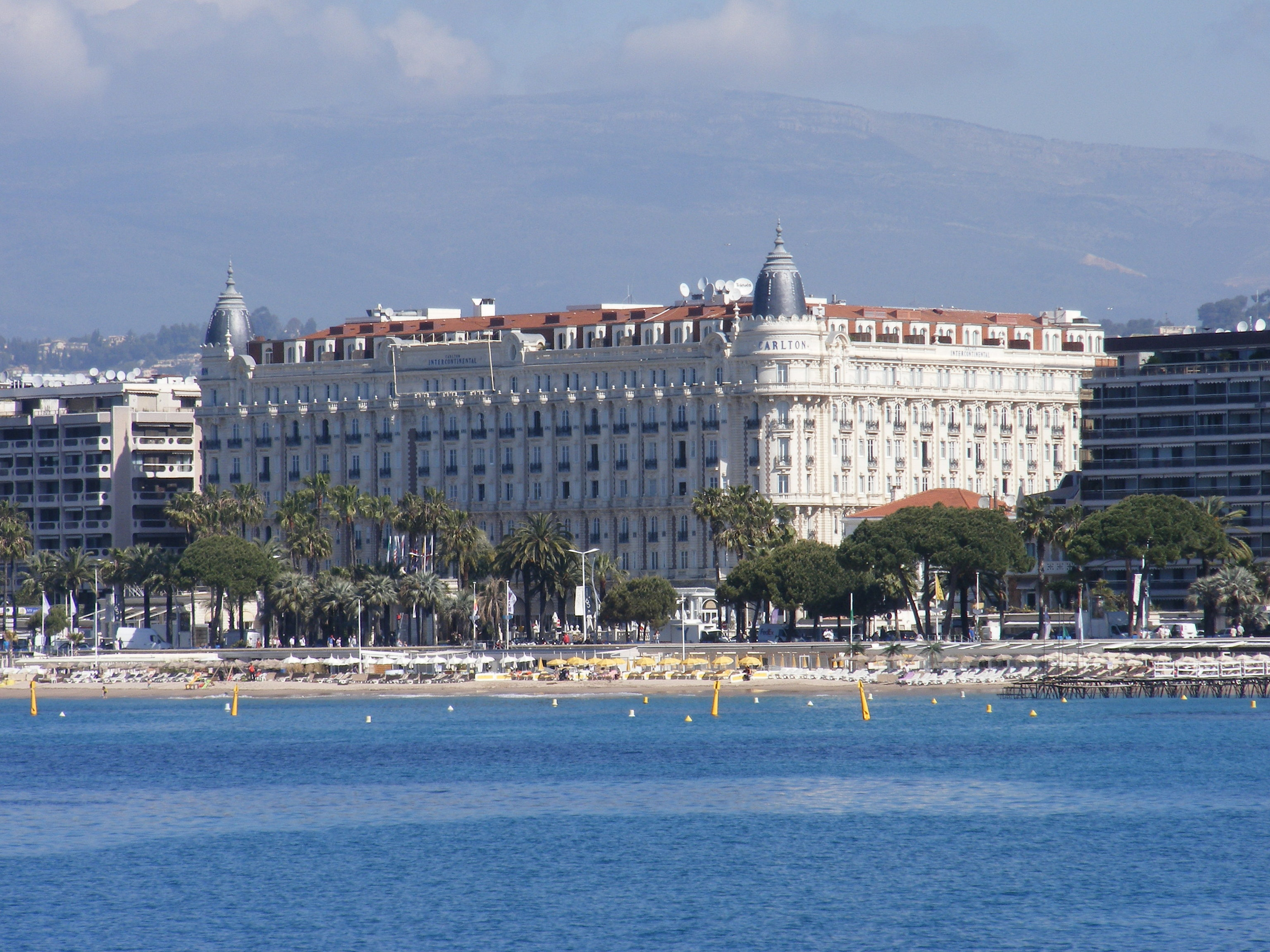
InterContinental Carlton Cannes

JW Marriott Cannes

=== Villas ===
Cannes of the 19th century can still be seen in its grand villas, built to reflect the wealth and standing of their owners and inspired by anything from medieval castles to Roman villas. They are not open to the public. Lord Brougham's Italianate Villa Eléonore Louise (one of the first in Cannes) was built between 1835 and 1839. Also known as the Quartier des Anglais, this is the oldest residential area in Cannes. Another landmark is the Villa Fiésole (known today as the Villa Domergue) designed by Jean-Gabriel Domergue in the style of Fiesole, near Florence, which may be visited on appointment.

=== Île Sainte-Marguerite ===
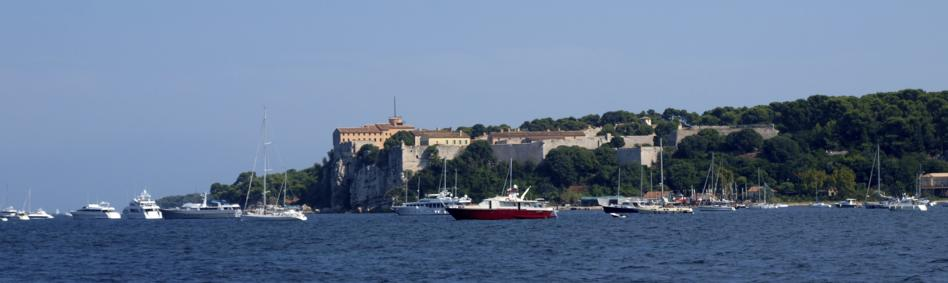
St. Marguerite Island

It took the Man in the Iron Mask 11 years to leave the tiny, forested St Marguerite Island. The mysterious individual was believed to be of noble blood, but his identity has never been proven. His cell can be visited in the Fort of St Marguerite, now renamed the Musée de la Mer (Museum of the Sea). This museum also houses discoveries from shipwrecks off the island, including Roman (1st century BC) and Saracen (10th century AD) ceramics.

=== Île Saint-Honorat ===
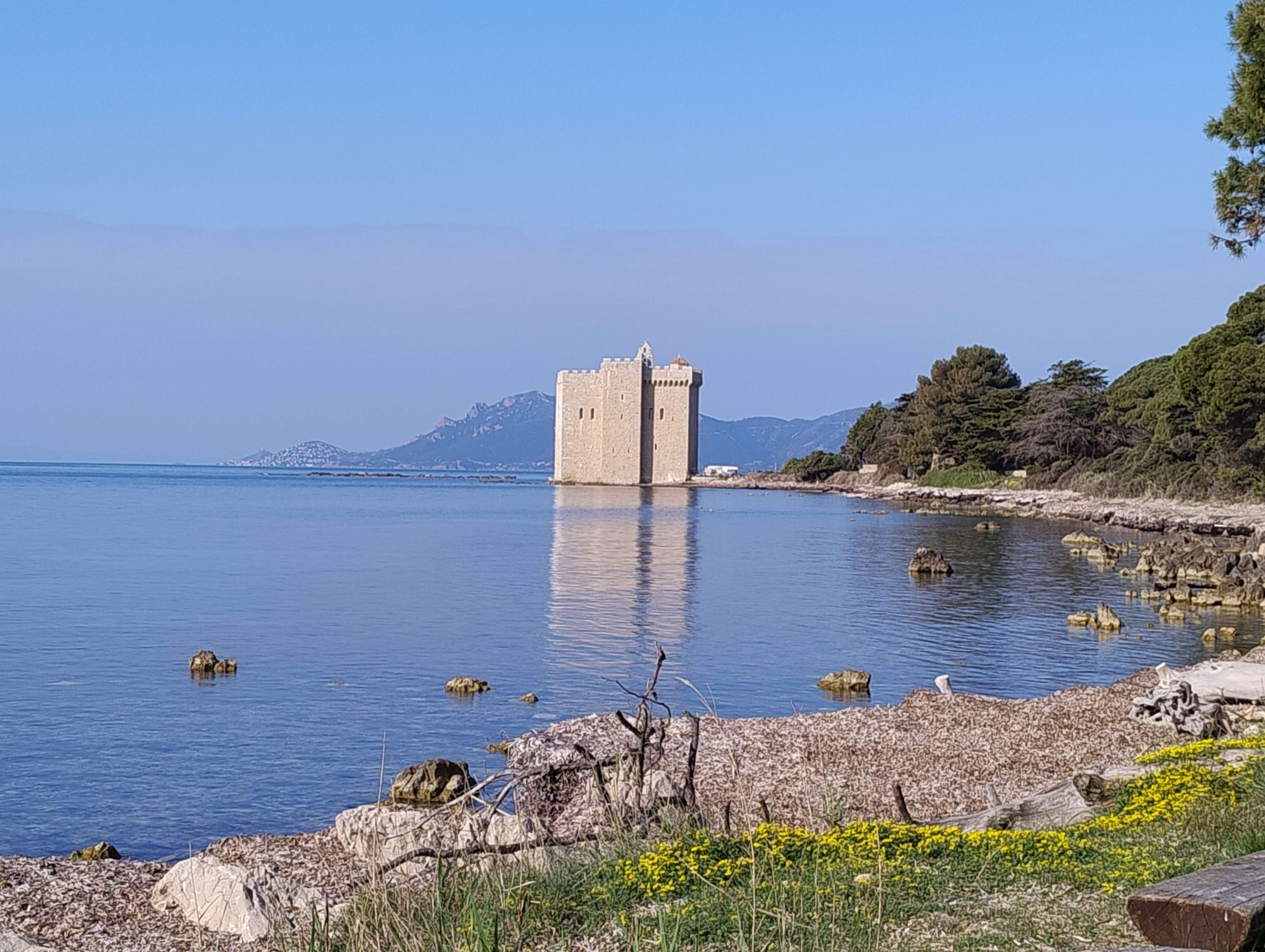
St. Honorat Island

Cistercian monks are the only inhabitants of the smaller, southern St Honorat Island. Monks have inhabited the island since AD 410 and, at the height of their powers, owned Cannes, Mougins, and Vallauris. Medieval vestiges remain in the stark church, which is open to the public, and in the ruins of the 11th-century monastery on the seashore. The monks inhabit the Lérins Abbey and divide their time between prayer and producing red and white wines.

=== Museums ===
The Musée d'Art et d'Histoire de Provence houses artifacts from prehistoric to present, in an 18th-century mansion. The Musée de la Castre has objects from the Pacific Atolls, Peruvian relics, and Mayan pottery. Other venues include the Musée de la Marine, Musée de la Mer, Musée de la Photographie and Musée International de la Parfumerie.

=== Theatre and music ===
Small venues stage productions and host short sketches during the annual International Actors' Performance Festival (Festival Performance d'Acteur). Local theaters include the Théâtre Debussy, the Espace Miramar and the Alexandre III.

=== Festivals and show events ===
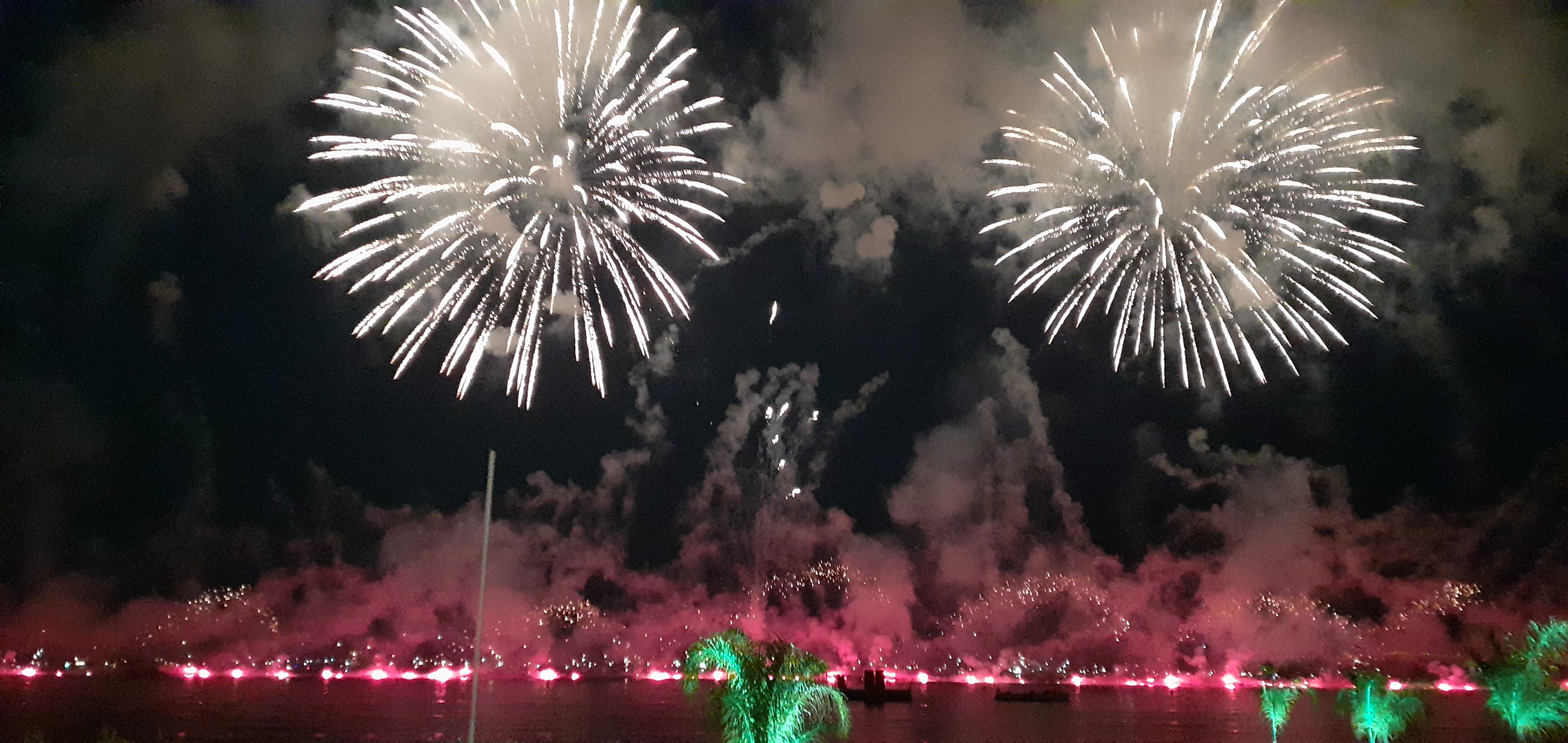
Festival d'art pyrotechnique de Cannes 2021

- The Cannes Film Festival founded in 1946 is held annually, usually in May, at the Palais des Festivals et des Congrès.
- The Cannes Lions International Festival of Creativity is a global event and awards show for those working in advertising and related fields, held annually in June.
- The Festival d'art pyrotechnique de Cannes is an annual fireworks competition held in the summer at the Bay of Cannes.
- Midem, the foremost trade show for the music industry.
- MIPIM, the world's largest property-related trade show.
- Carnival on the Riviera is an annual parade through the streets to mark the 21 days before Shrove Tuesday.
- The International Festival of Games is a festival of bridge, belote, backgammon, chess, draughts, tarot, and more (February).
- Cannes Yachting Festival is an event for boating enthusiasts in the Vieux Port (September).
- The International Actors' Performance Festival: comedy sketches and performances by fringe artists
- The International Luxury Travel Market brings together under one roof the top international luxury travel providers and suppliers from all around the world.
- The Global Champions Tour showjumping league has an annual event in the ports of Cannes.
- MIPCOM and MIPTV, held in October and April respectively, are the world's most important trade markets for the television industry.
- The Pan-African Film Festival, held in early April and featuring films from the African diaspora.

== Economy ==
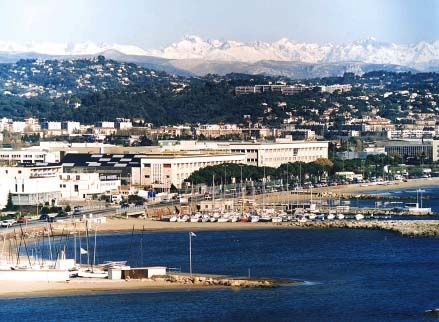
The Cannes Mandelieu aero centre

The area around Cannes has developed into a high-tech cluster. The technopolis of Sophia Antipolis lies in the hills beyond Cannes. The Film Festival is a major event for the industry which takes place every year in May. In addition, Cannes hosts other major annual events such as the MIPIM, MIPTV, MIDEM, Cannes Lions, and the NRJ Music Awards. There is an annual television festival in the last week in September.

The economic environment is based on tourism, business fairs, trade, and aviation. Cannes has 6,500 companies, of which 3,000 are traders, artisans, and service providers. In 2006, 421 new companies were registered.

Cannes hosts the Cannes Mandelieu Space Center, headquarters of Thales Alenia Space, the first European satellite manufacturer.

== Sport ==
Cannes is home to the football side AS Cannes, which currently plays in the French fourth division. The club is notable for having launched the professional career of Zinedine Zidane.

The city hosts the Jumping International de Cannes international horse jumping event every June.

Cannes women's volleyball team RC Cannes has been very successful (won twenty French Championships and two CEV Champions League).

== Transport ==
=== Nice Côte d'Azur Airport ===
Located 24 km (15 mi) from Cannes, Nice Côte d'Azur Airport. The smaller Cannes–Mandelieu Airport is nearby.

=== Rail ===
Cannes station is the main railway station for the city of Cannes. It is situated on the Marseille–Ventimiglia railway. There are several rail services, including:

- TGVs from Paris Gare de Lyon to Nice
- TER from Marseille St Charles to Nice
- TER service from Cannes to Les Arcs
- TER service from Grasse/Cannes to Ventimiglia (Italy).

The former's occasional Thello (Italian train) from Marseille St Charles to Milan ceased in December 2021.

Cannes-la-Bocca station is both a passenger station and a goods/maintenance depot. It is situated alongside the beach and has a connection to local ferries. There are three more stations on the line to Grasse: Le Bosquet, La Frayère, and Ranguin.

=== Bus ===
Coach services arrive at the Gare Routière de Cannes, in the centre of the city, near the Town Hall. Companies from abroad include Eurolines and Agence Phocéens. Regional services are by Rapides Côte d'Azur and CTM, with services from Nice and Grasse/Mandelieu respectively. Local bus services are provided by Bus Azur.

=== Ferry ===
Ferries are available in the Nice harbour from Bastia and Calvi in Corsica, with services provided by SNCM Ferryterranée and Corsica Ferries. From Bastia, the journey is 4 hours, and 45 minutes on conventional ferries, and 3 hours, and 40 minutes on express ferries, while from Calvi, conventional vessels take 3 hours, and 45 minutes, and express vessels take 2 hours and 45 minutes. An average of four ferries a day sail on these routes, with more during summer.

=== Port ===
Cannes has 2 marinas – Vieux Port de Cannes (with 800 berths up to 145 m in length) beside the Palais des Festivals and Port Pierre Canto at the far end of the Croisette. Vieux Port is the main port and is used for cruise stopovers and yacht charters.

Panorama of Cannes waterfront, from which many ferries can be caught

== International relations ==
Cannes is twinned with:

- Acapulco, Mexico
- (United States) Beverly Hills, California, US
- Kensington and Chelsea, United Kingdom
- Shizuoka, Japan

Cannes has friendship pacts with:

Florence, Italy; Gstaad, Saanen, Switzerland; Huế, Vietnam; Moscow, Russia; Da Nang, Vietnam	Papeete, French Polynesia; Quebec City, Quebec, Canada; Nha Trang, Vietnam; Tel Aviv, Israel; Turin, Italy

== Notable people ==
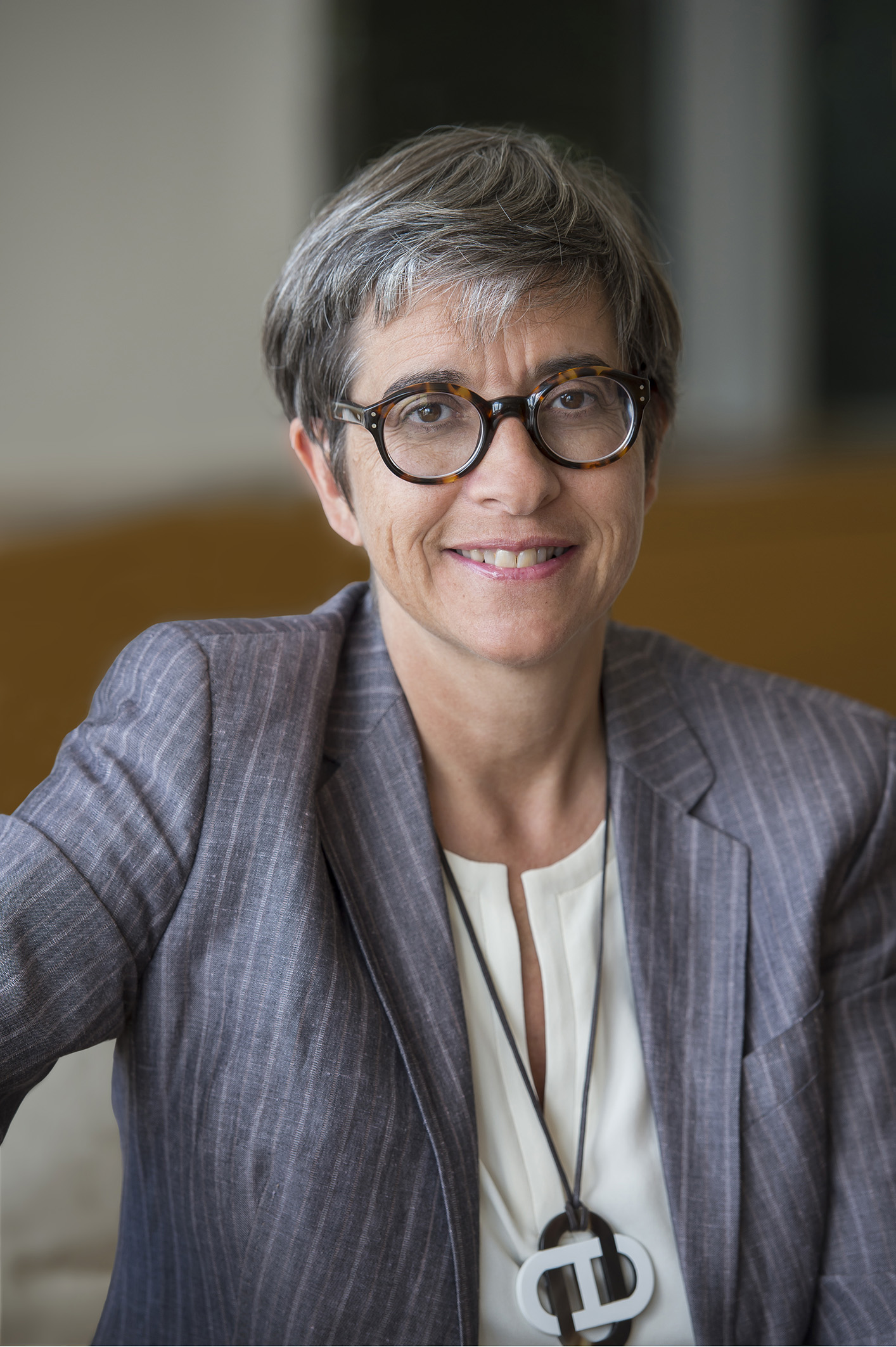
Catherine Guillouard, 2017

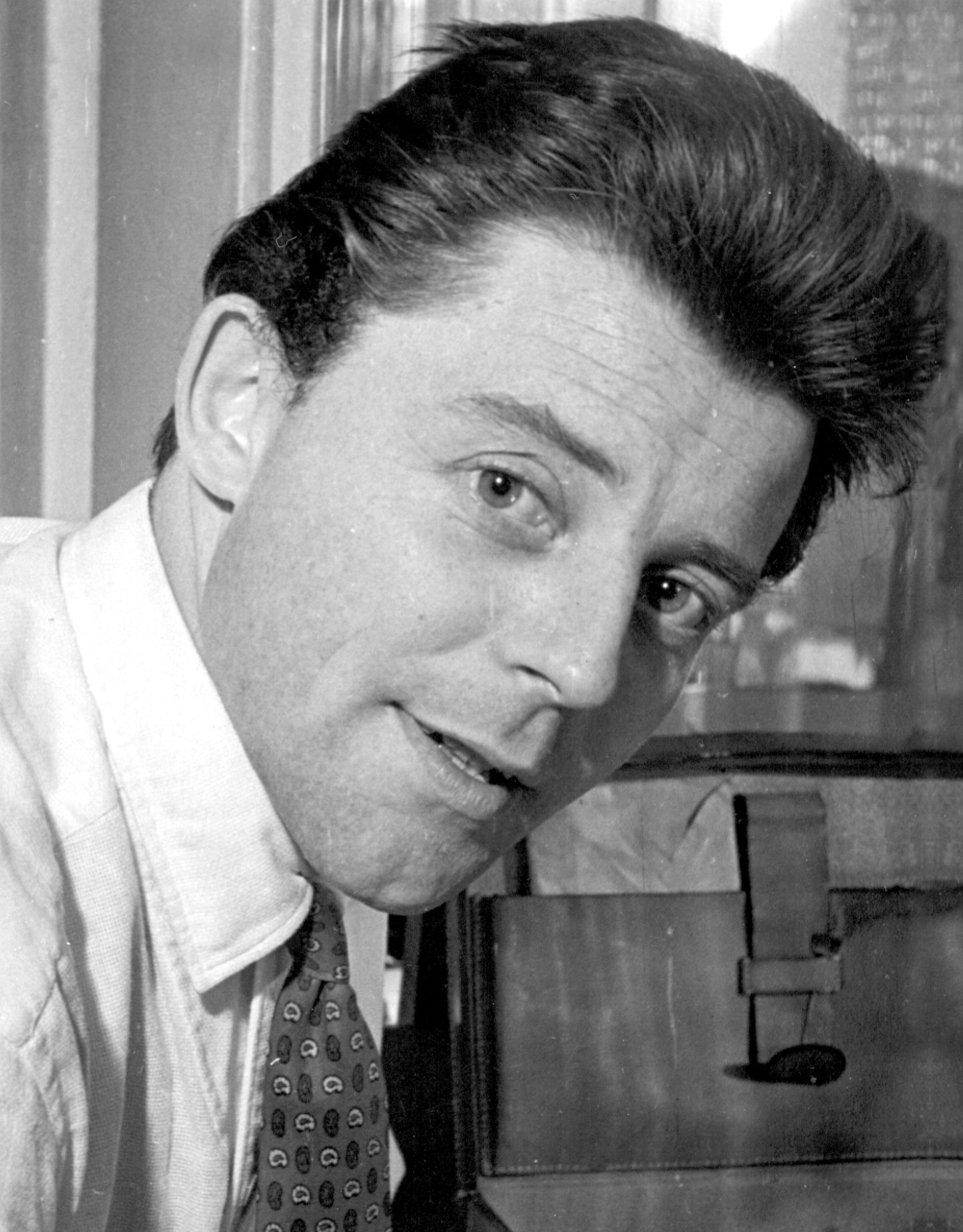
Gérard Philipe, 1955

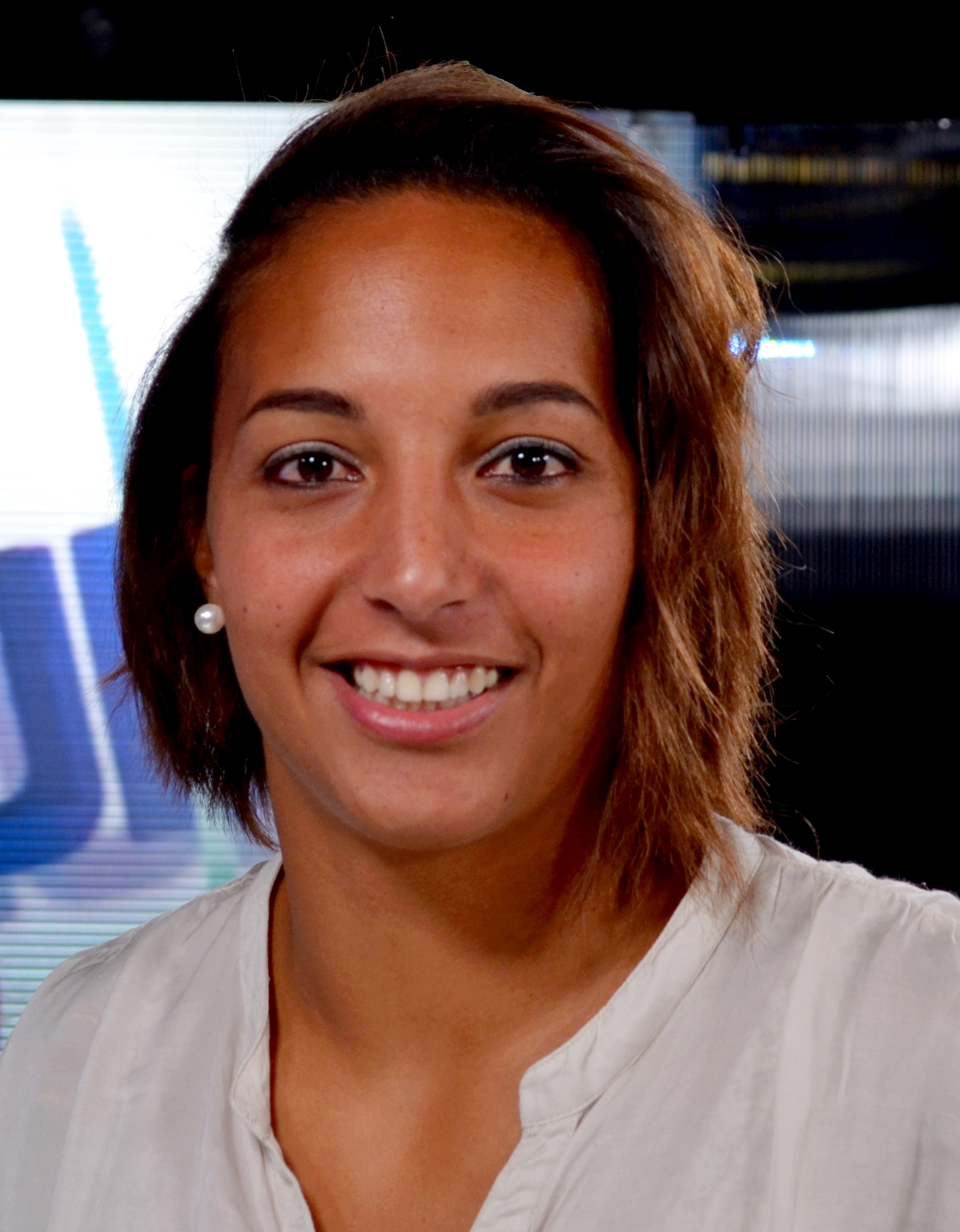
Sarah Bouhaddi, 2014

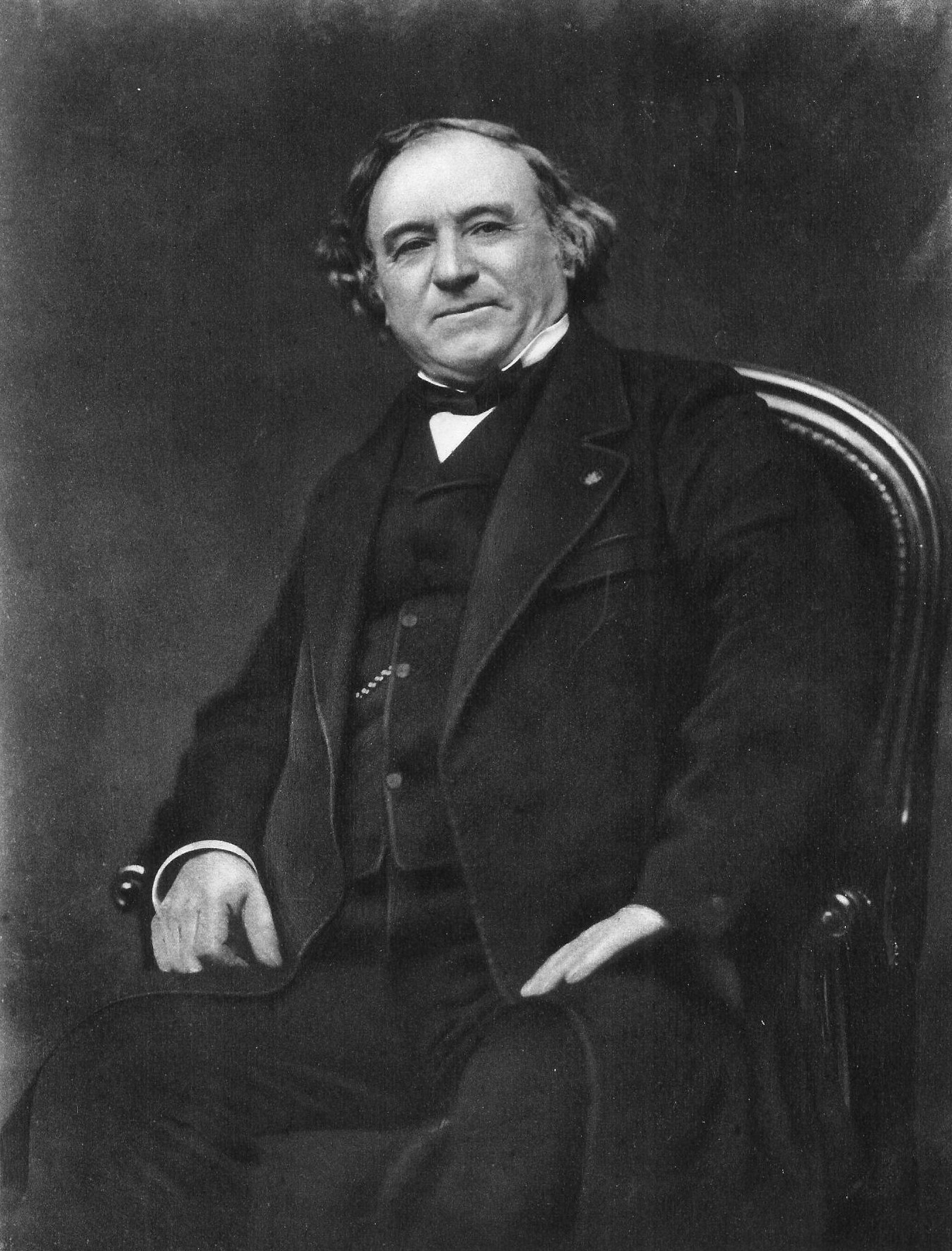
Jean-Baptiste Dumas

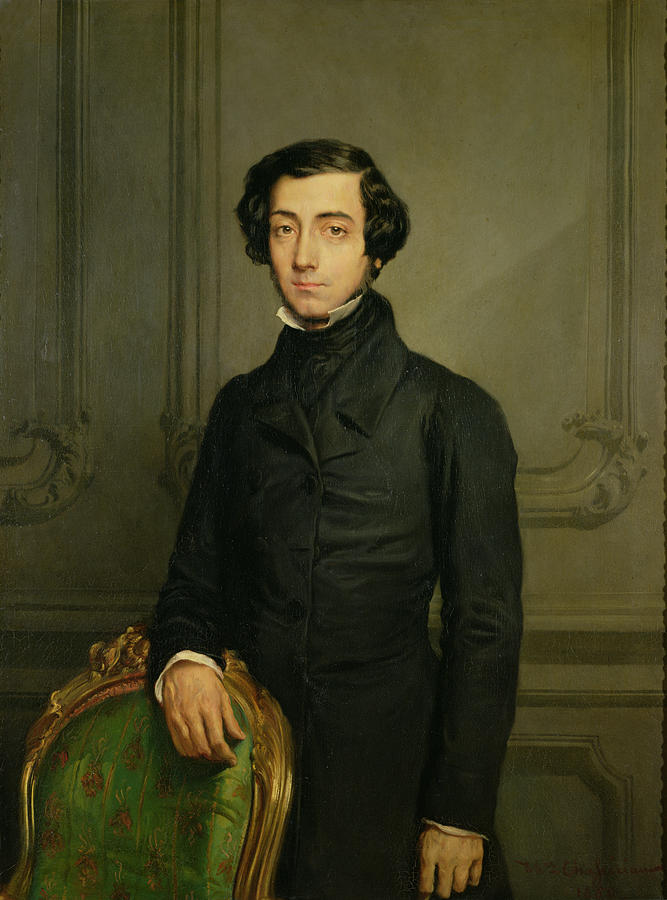
Alexis de Tocqueville, 1850

=== Public service ===
- Dante Livio Bianco (1909–1953), Italian civil lawyer and wartime partisan leader.
- Anne Spoerry (1918–1999), French-Kenyan doctor and pilot
- Karan Singh (born 1931), former ruler of Jammu and Kashmir, Indian diplomat and politician
- Infanta Pilar, Duchess of Badajoz (1936–2020), Spanish royal and Grandee of Spain
- Jean-Charles Terrassier (1940–2022), psychologist, specialized in childhood intellectual giftedness
- Norbert Turini (born 1954), prelate of the Catholic Church, archbishop of Montpellier.
- Catherine Guillouard (born 1965), CEO of RATP Group, state-owned public transport operator

=== The arts ===
- Amédée de Vallombrosa (1880–1968), classical organist
- Gérard Philipe (1922–1959), theater and film actor
- Claude Mercier-Ythier (1931–2020), French harpsichord maker
- James de Beaujeu Domville (1933–2015), theatrical producer and Commissioner of the National Film Board of Canada
- Gabriel Tacchino (born 1934), French classical pianist and piano teacher
- Vojislav Stanimirovic (1937–2022), reformed criminal, writer, journalist, and artist
- Jean-Jacques Kantorow (born 1945), violinist and conductor
- Jacques Israelievitch (1948–2015), a French violinist
- Paolo Barzman (born 1957), French-American film director
- Frédéric Boyer (born 1961), author of novels, poems, and essays
- Cécilia Cara (born 1984), French actress and singer

=== Sport ===
- Bernard Casoni (born 1961), a former footballer with 488 club caps and 30 for France
- Yann Bonato (born 1972), basketball player
- Johan Micoud (born 1973), footballer with 485 club caps and 17 for France
- Cyrille Sauvage (born 1973), racing driver
- Sébastien Vieilledent (born 1976), rower and gold medallist at the Rowing at the 2004 Summer Olympics – Men's double sculls
- Sarah Bouhaddi (born 1986), footballer with over 300 club caps and 149 for France women
- Anthony Modeste, (born 1988), football player with over 400 club caps
- Tony Ramoin (born 1988), snowboarder, bronze medallist at the 2010 Winter Olympics.
- Élodie Lorandi (born 1989), a swimmer and medallist at the 2008 and 2012 Summer Paralympics
- Johann Zarco (born 1990), Grand Prix motorcycle racer
- Norman Nato (born 1992), racing driver
- Brandon Maïsano (born 1993), racing driver
- Dylan Bronn (born 1995), a footballer with over 200 club caps and 35 for Tunisia
- Timothé Luwawu-Cabarrot (born 1995), NBA player
- Dorian Boccolacci (born 1998), racing driver
- Lenny Martinez (born 2003), professional cyclist

=== Died in Cannes ===
- Louis Blanc (1811–1882), a French socialist politician and historian.
- Henry Brougham, 1st Baron Brougham and Vaux (1778–1868), British statesman & Lord Chancellor.
- John Francis Campbell (1821–1885), a Scottish author and scholar.
- Spencer Cavendish, 8th Duke of Devonshire (1833–1908), a British statesman.
- Victor Cousin (1792–1867), a French philosopher, founded "eclecticism".
- Jean-Baptiste Dumas (1800–1884), a French chemist, worked on organic analysis and synthesis.
- T. E. Ellis (1859-1899), Welsh politician, leader of Cymru Fydd.
- François Gagnepain (1866–1952), botanist
- Benjamin Godard (1849–1895), a French violinist and Romantic-era composer.
- Charles Grant, 1st Baron Glenelg (1778–1866), a Scottish politician and colonial administrator.
- Nubar Gulbenkian (1896–1972), Armenian business magnate and socialite
- Prince Leopold, Duke of Albany (1853−1884), eighth child of Queen Victoria and Prince Albert
- Prosper Mérimée (1803–1870), a French Romanticism writer.
- Sir Monier Monier-Williams (1819–1899), an Oxford scholar who taught Asian languages.
- Jacques Monod (1910–1976), French microbiologist and biochemist, Nobel prizewinner
- Sir Henry James Sumner Maine (1822–1888), a British Whig comparative jurist and historian.
- Alexis de Tocqueville (1805–1859), aristocrat, diplomat, political scientist & philosopher, and historian.
- Charilaos Trikoupis (1832–1896), Greek politician, Prime Minister of Greece seven times, 1875–1895.

== Gallery ==
Palais des Festivals et des Congrès

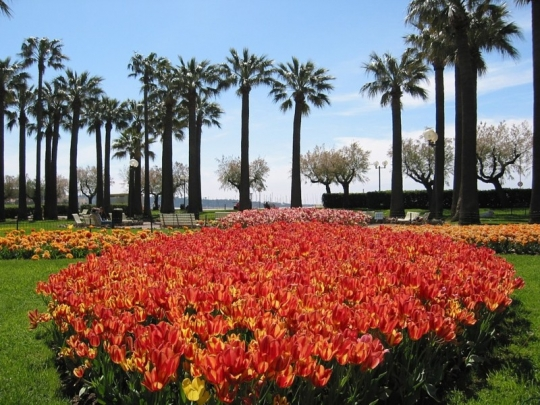
The Croisette gardens

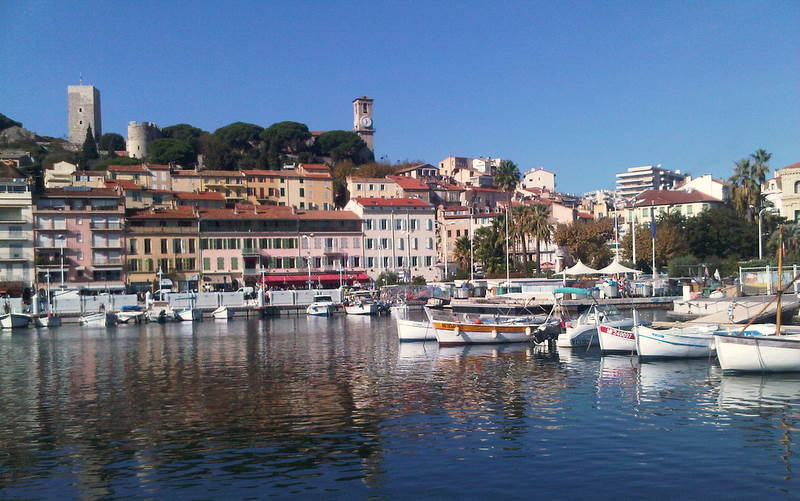
The old harbour

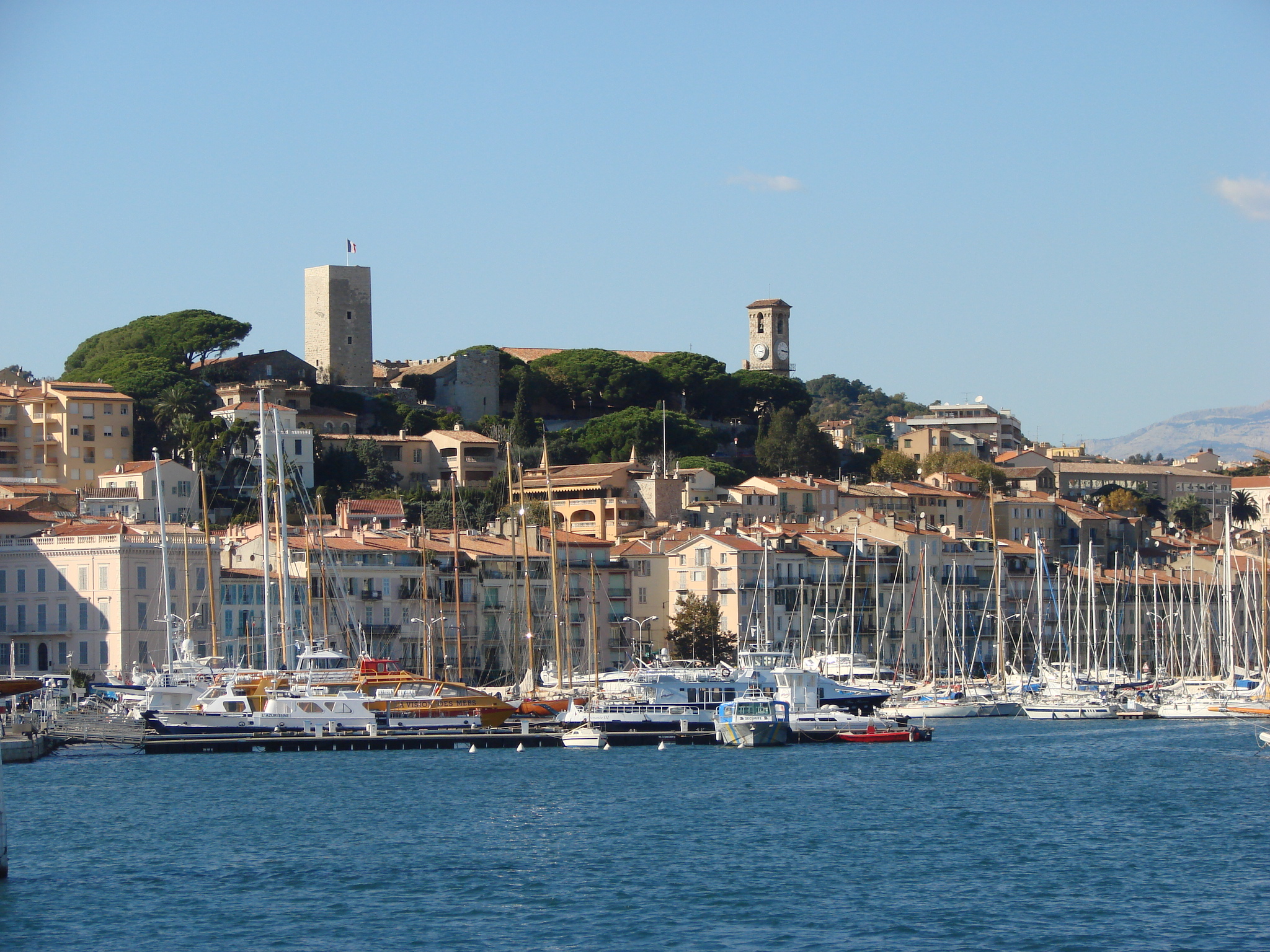
Le Suquet, the old quarter of Cannes

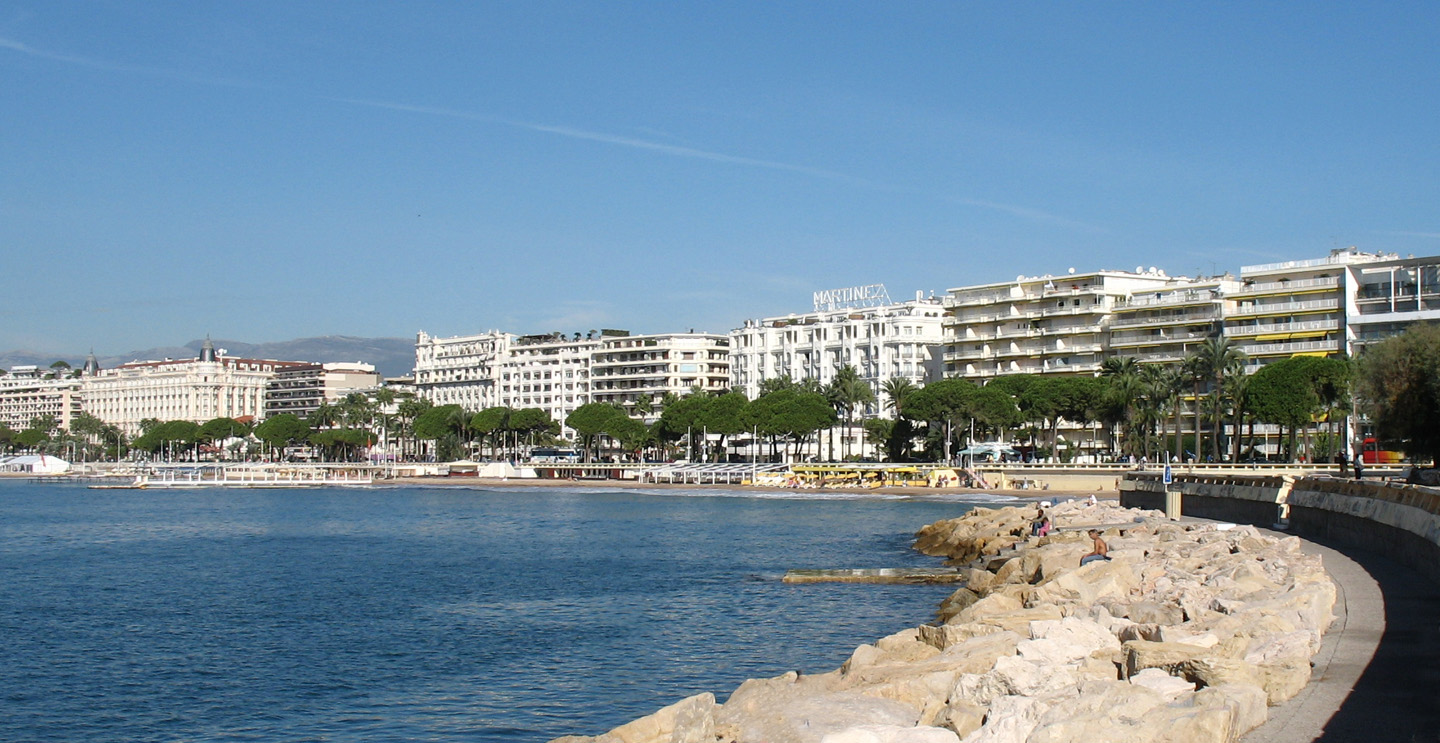
Promenade de la Croisette

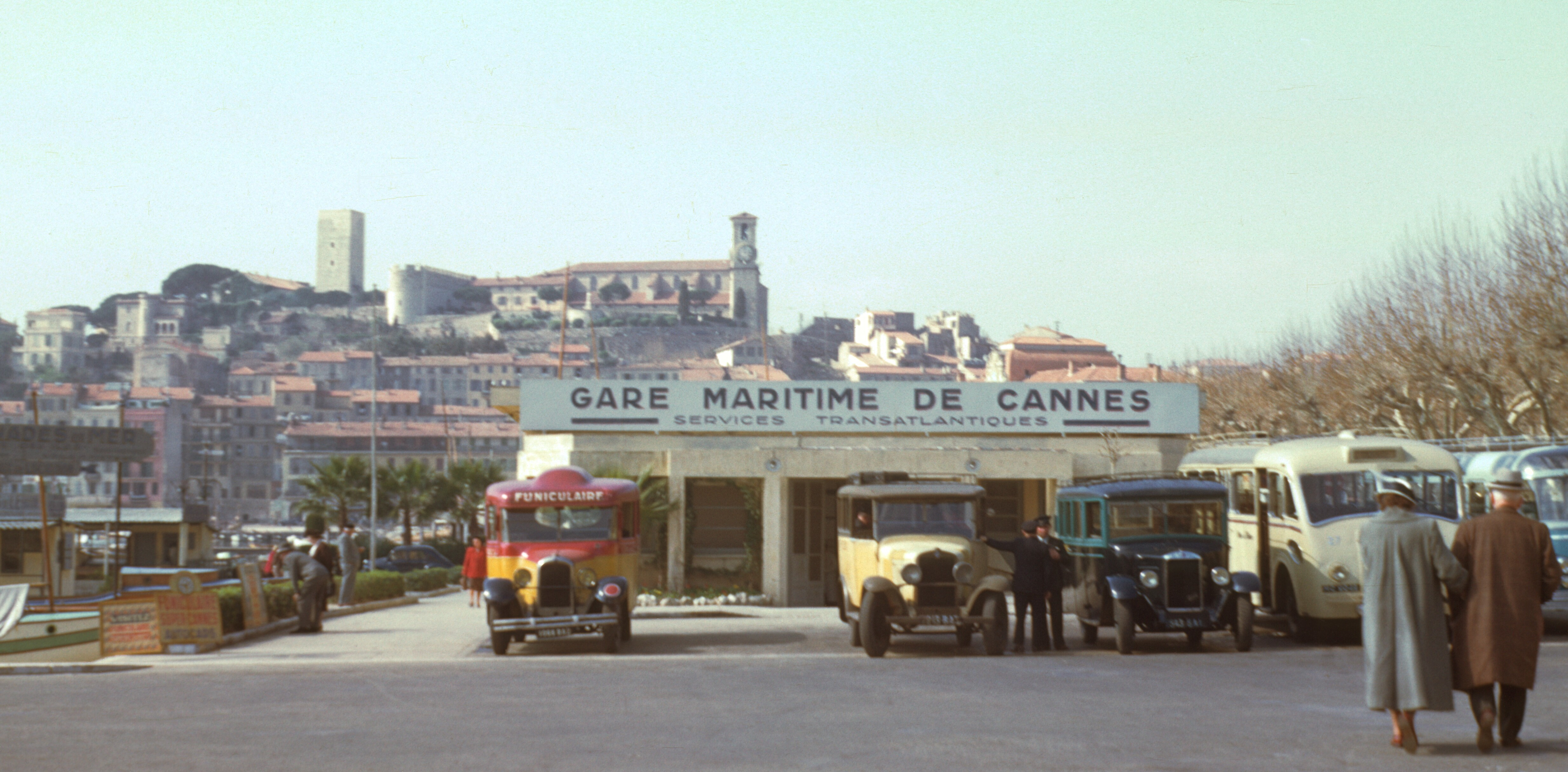
Cannes in 1950

== See also ==
- Communes of the Alpes-Maritimes department
