= Promenade de la Croisette =

Prominent road in Cannes, France

Coordinates: 43°32′57″N 7°1′36″E

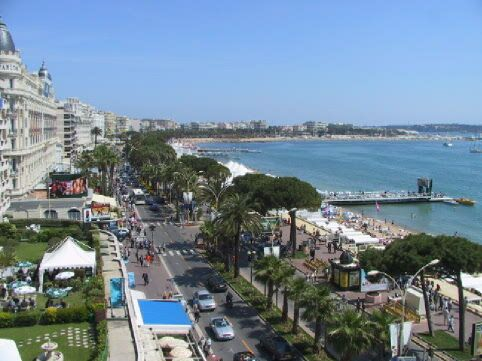
The Croisette

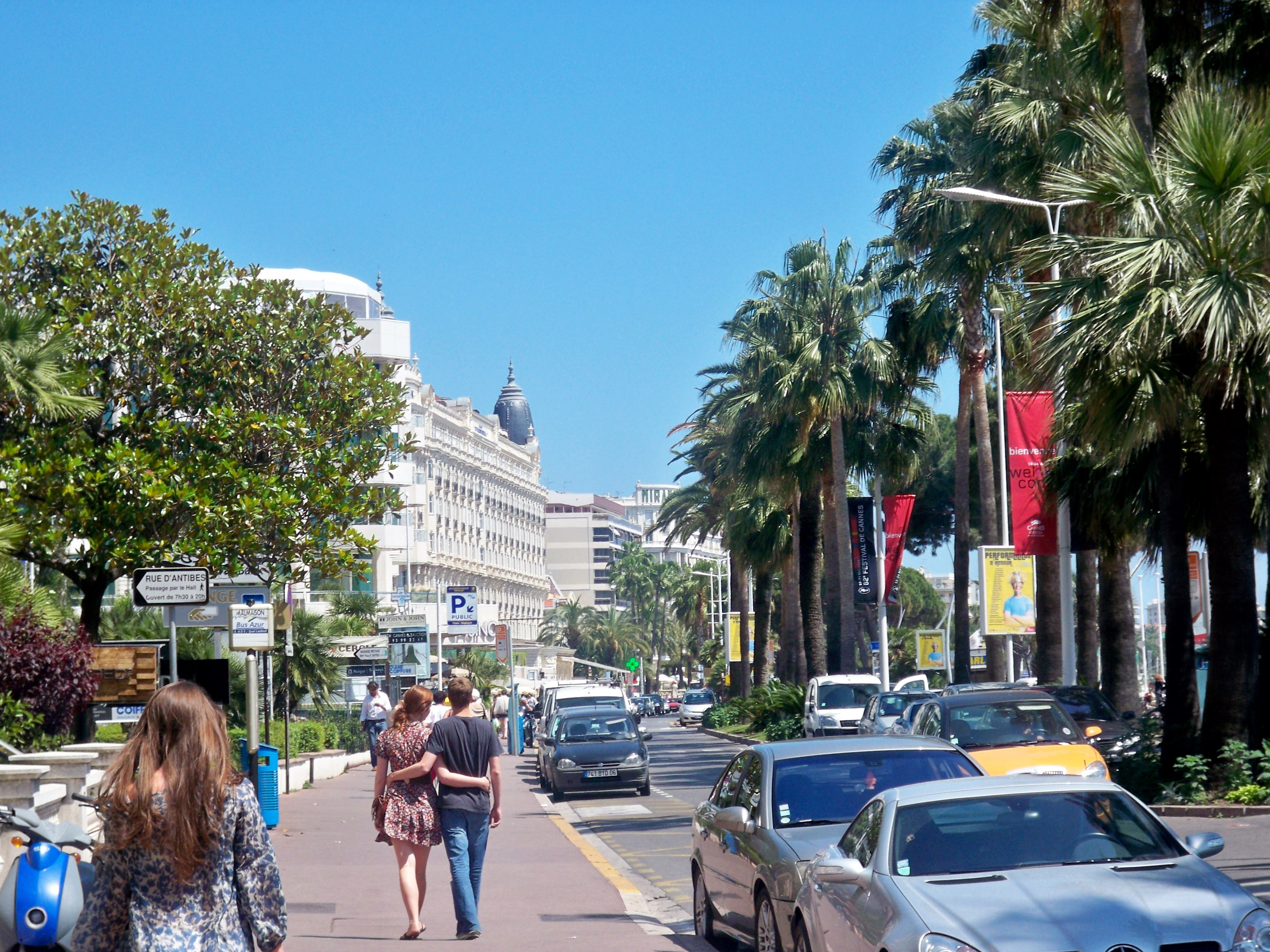
Promenade de la Croisette

The Promenade de la Croisette (French: [pʁɔm(ə)nad də la kʁwazɛt]), or Boulevard de la Croisette, is a prominent road in Cannes, France. It stretches along the shore of the Mediterranean Sea and is about 2 km long. The Croisette is known for the Palais des Festivals et des Congrès, where the Cannes Film Festival is held. Many expensive shops, upscale restaurants, and hotels (such as the Carlton, Majestic, JW Marriott Cannes, and Martinez) line the road. It goes completely along the coastline of Cannes.

The Croisette is listed in the cultural heritage general inventory of France.

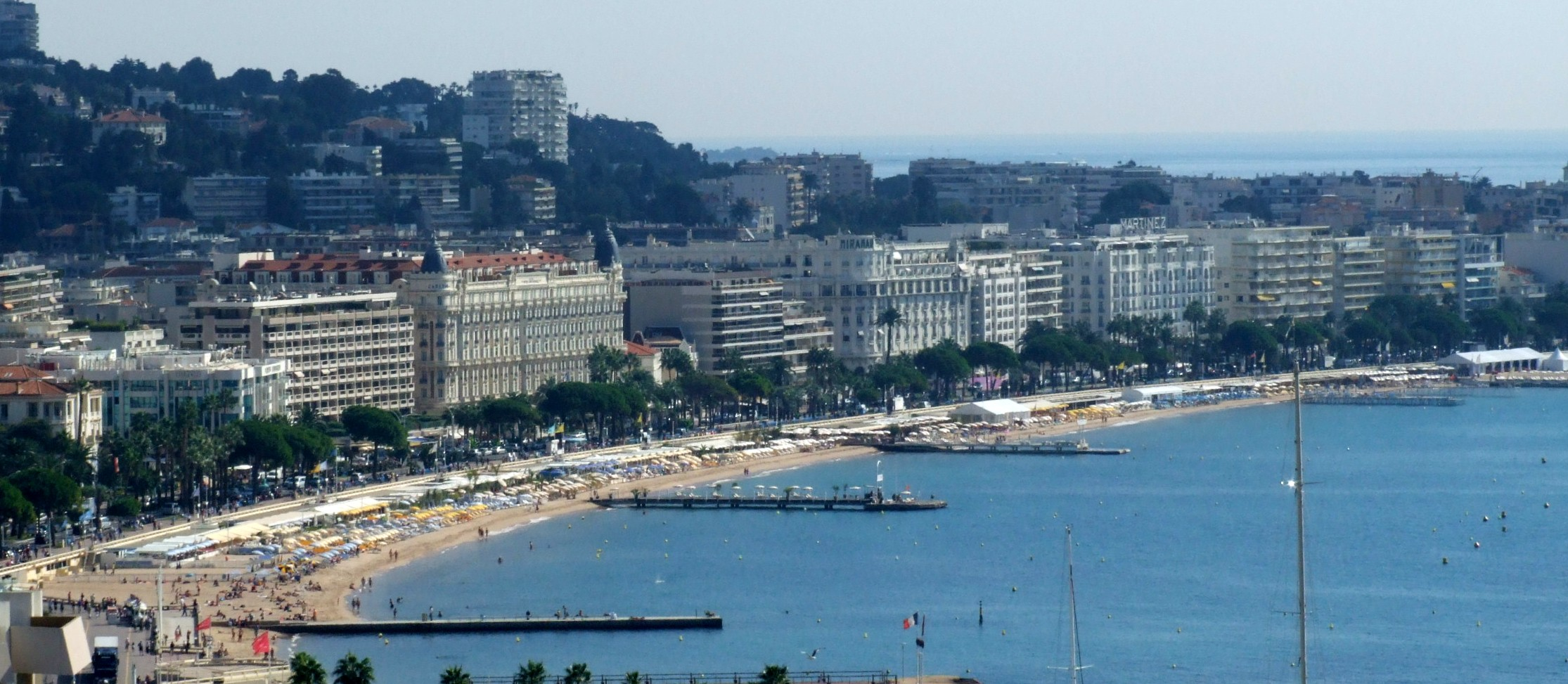
Panorama of the Croisette
