= Hôtel Martinez =

Hotel in Cannes, France

- Interactive map of the Hôtel Martinez area

General information
- Location: Cannes, France
- Coordinates: 43°32′51″N 7°1′50″E
- Opening: 1929
- Owner: Constellation Hotels Holdings

Technical details
- Floor count: 7

Design and construction
- Architects: Charles Palmero; Pierre Veunevot; Pierre-Yves Rochon (Interior)

Other information
- Number of rooms: 409
- Number of suites: 99
- Number of restaurants: 4

The Hôtel Martinez is an Art Deco hotel on the Promenade de la Croisette in Cannes. It was opened on 20 February 1929 by Emmanuel Michele Martinez, son of Baron Giovanni Martinez and Giuseppa Labiso Costanza, members of a noble Italian family of Spanish origins from Palermo. Karan Singh, the crown prince of Jammu and Kashmir, was born there in 1931.

== History ==
In 1927, Emmanuel Michele Martinez, a manager of hotels in London and Paris and the director of the Cannes Luxury Hotel Association, decided to build his own hotel on the Côte d'Azur. Using the connections his family had with nobility, Martinez bought the "Villa Marie-Therese" on September 22, 1927, from Alfonso XII. The Hôtel Martinez opened in 1929.

During World War II, the hotel was occupied successively by the French Army, the Italian Army, the Commission d'armistice, the German Army, and (after Victory in Europe Day) by the US Air Force.

In 1981, the hotel was sold to the Concorde Hotels & Resorts Group (belonging to the Taittinger Group).

In 2005, four hotels, including the Hôtel Martinez, were sold to Starwood Capital Group.

The hotel was sold in 2012 and joined the Hyatt Group on April 9, 2013. It was renamed the Grand Hyatt Cannes Hotel Martinez. The hotel closed for renovations on October 30, 2017, and reopened for business on March 5, 2018, under its original name.

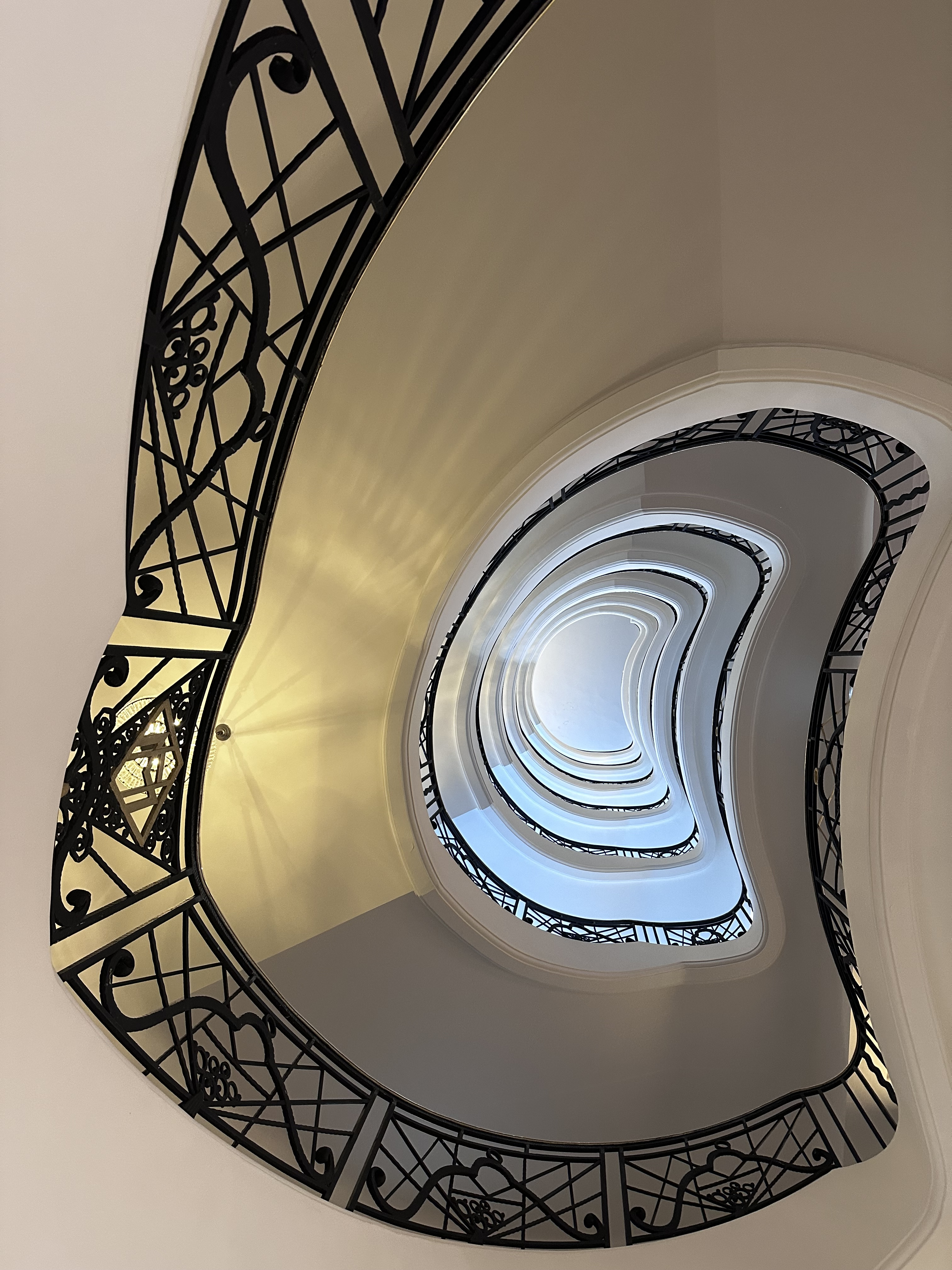
The grand staircase of the Hôtel Martinez

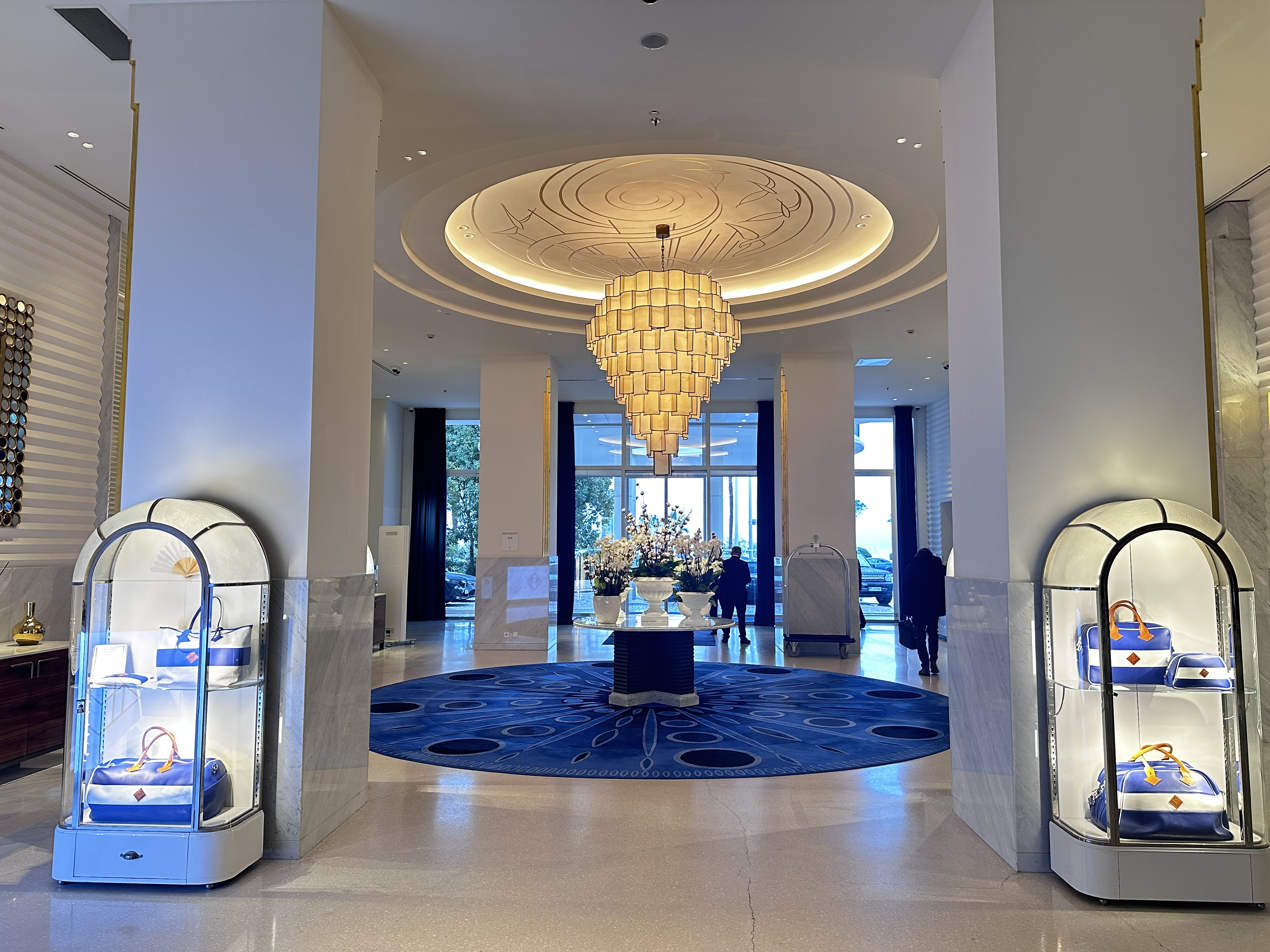
The hotel lobby

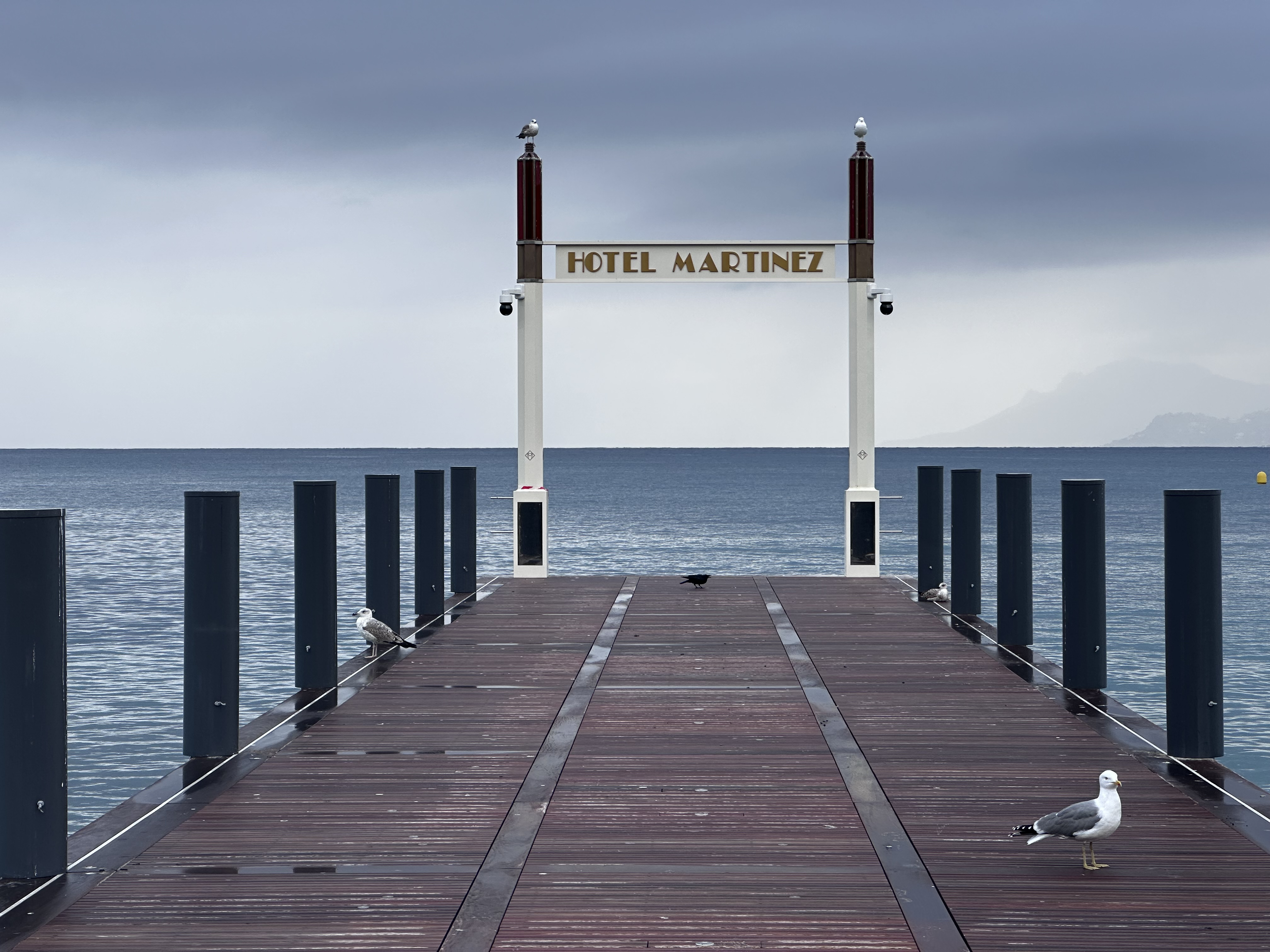
The pier at the hotel beach

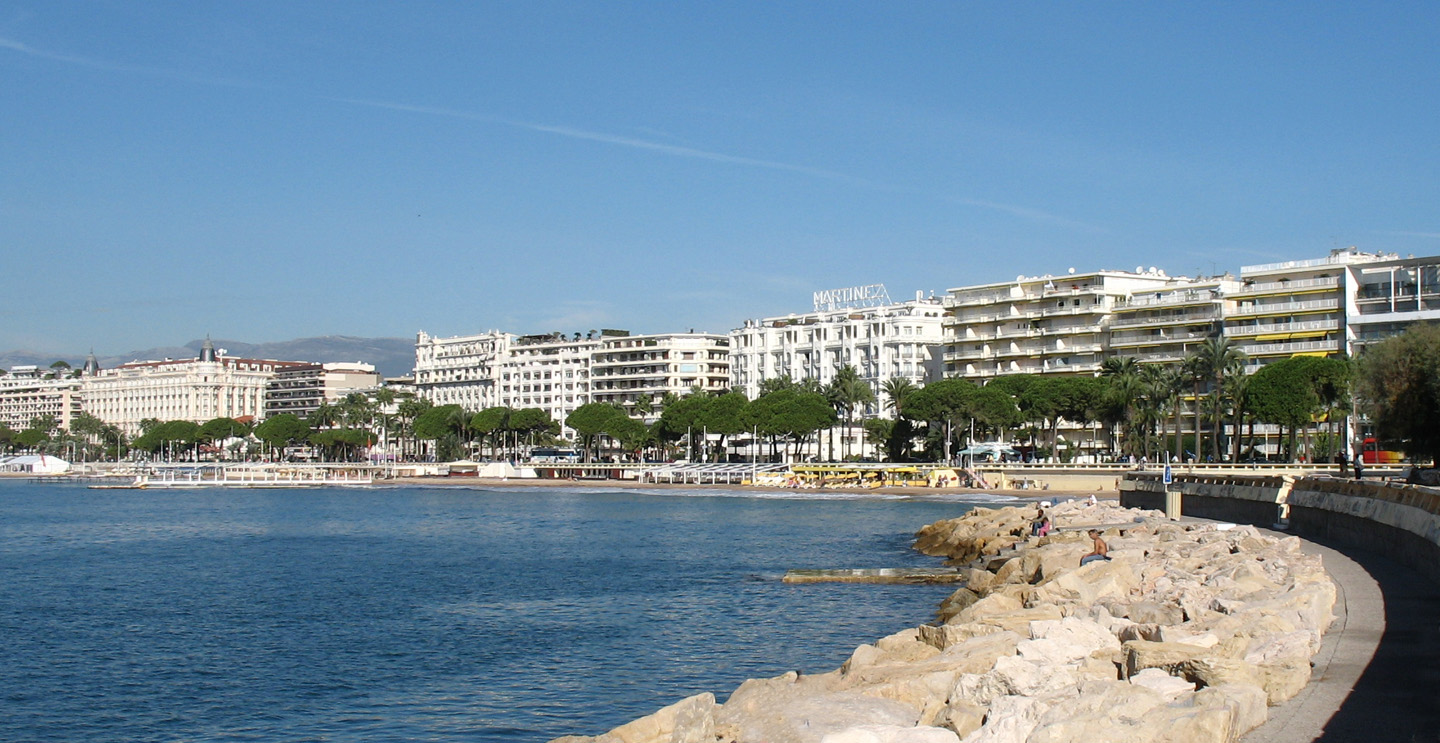
La Croisette with the Hôtel Martinez in the center

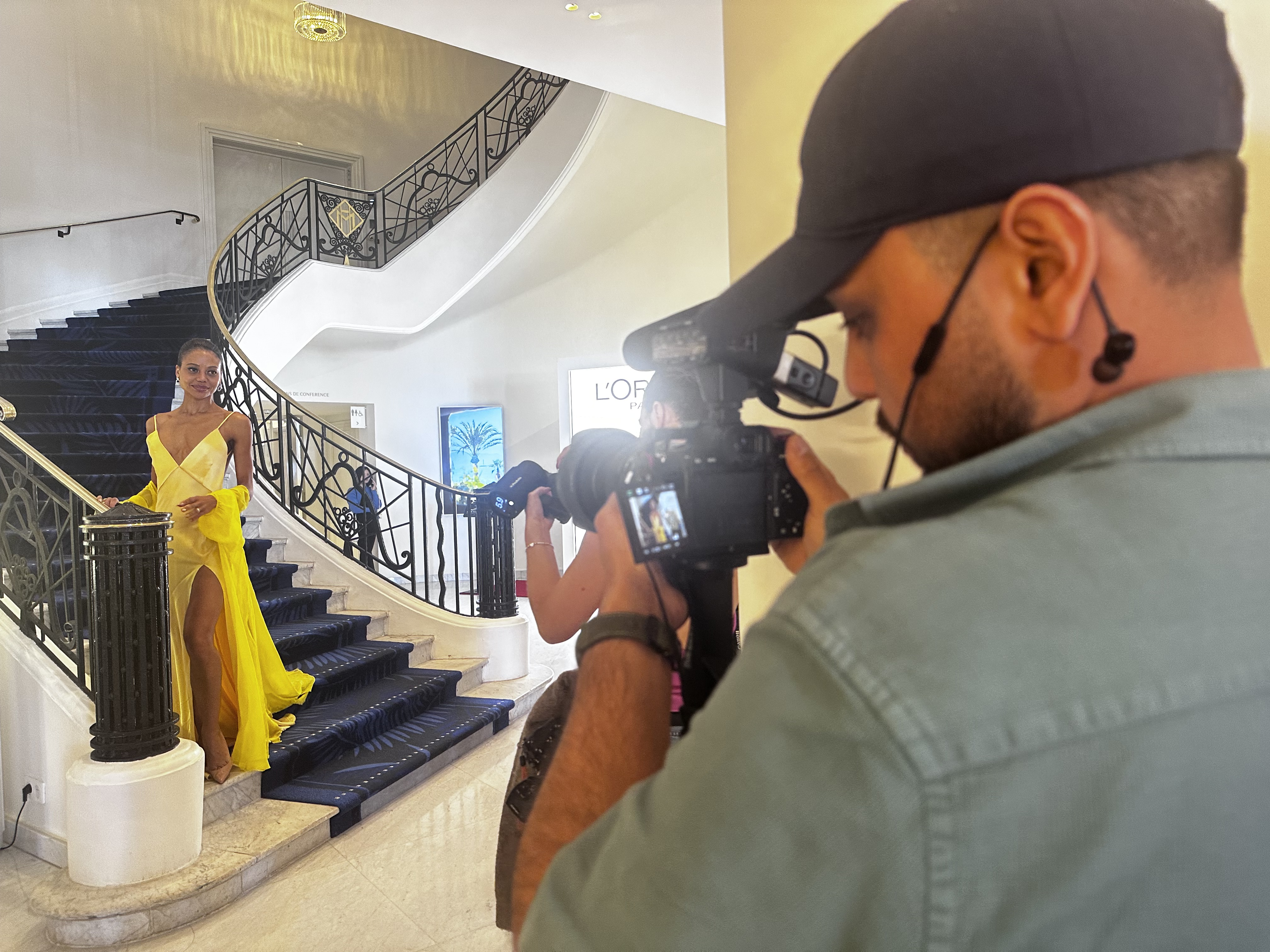
Photoshoot of Emma Thynn in the lobby in front of the staircase

== Location ==
The Hôtel Martinez is located on the Croisette at Cannes, 500 meters from the palais des Festivals, facing the Mediterranean Sea, the Bay of Cannes and the Lérins Islands.
