= Haussmann's renovation of Paris =

1853–1870 French public works programme

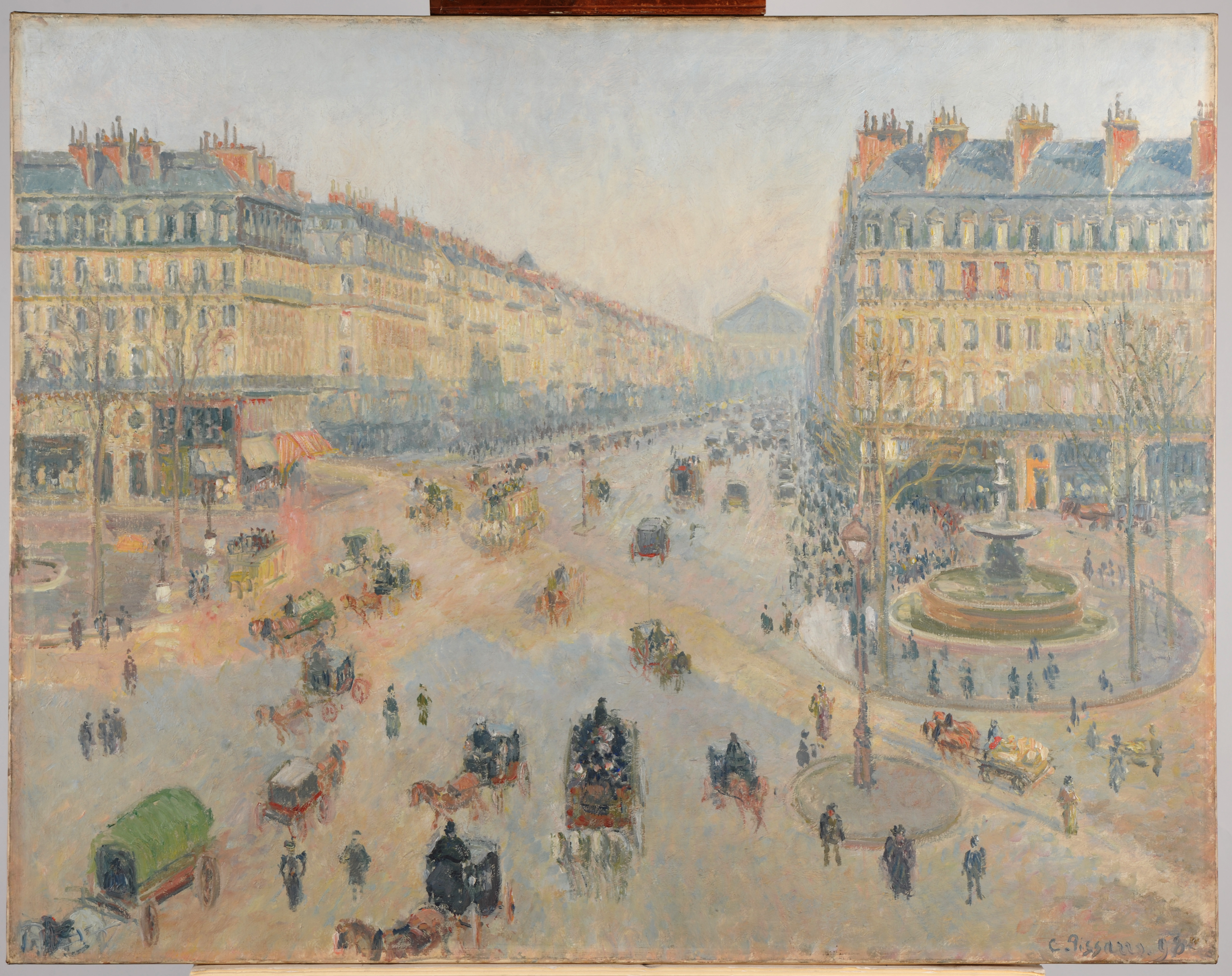
Napoleon III instructed Haussmann to bring air and light to the centre of Paris, to unify the different neighbourhoods with boulevards, and to make Paris more beautiful. The Avenue de l'Opéra, created by Haussmann, painted by Camille Pissarro, 1898.

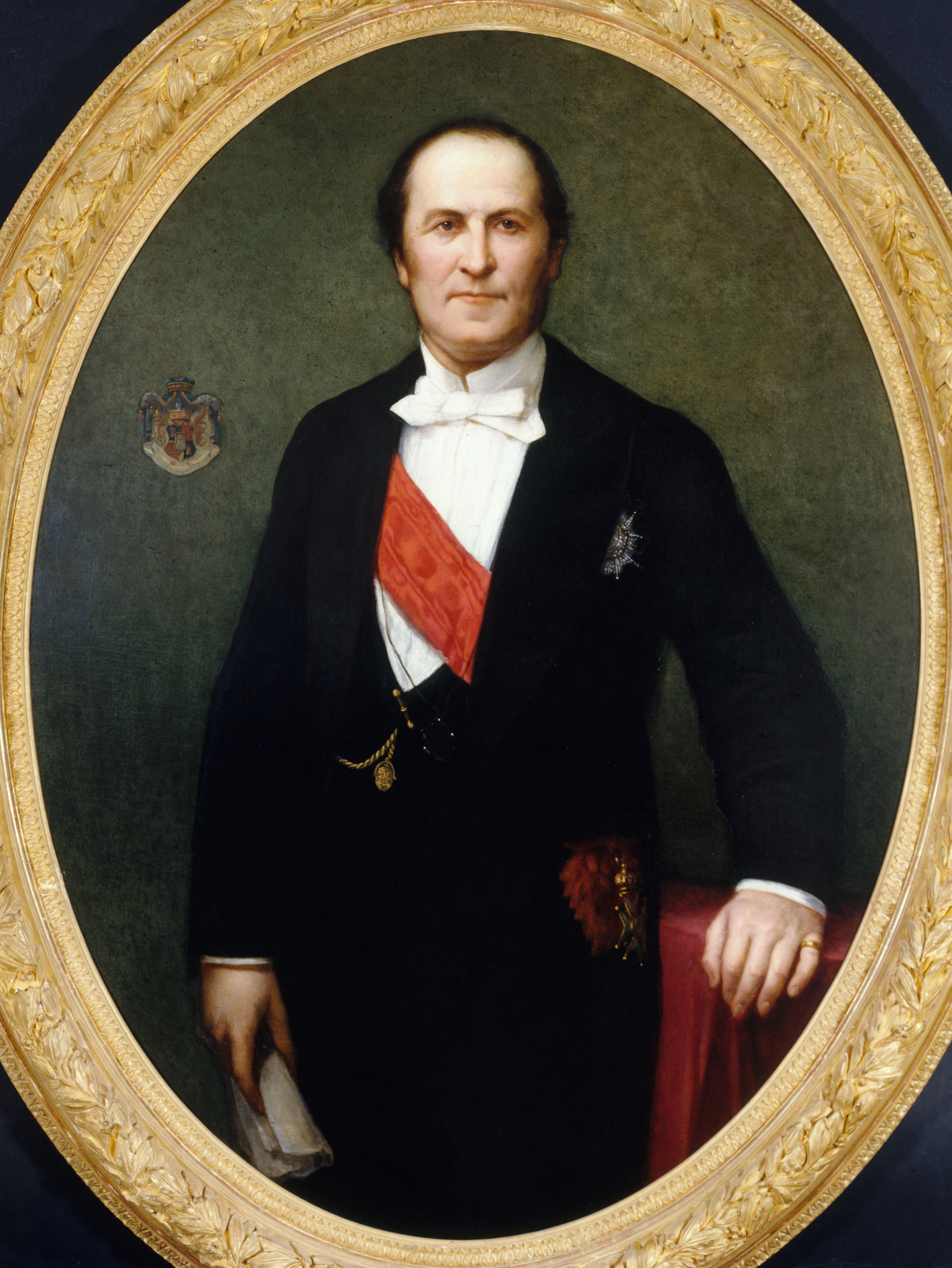
Georges-Eugène Haussmann, prefect of Seine under Napoleon III from 1853 until 1870

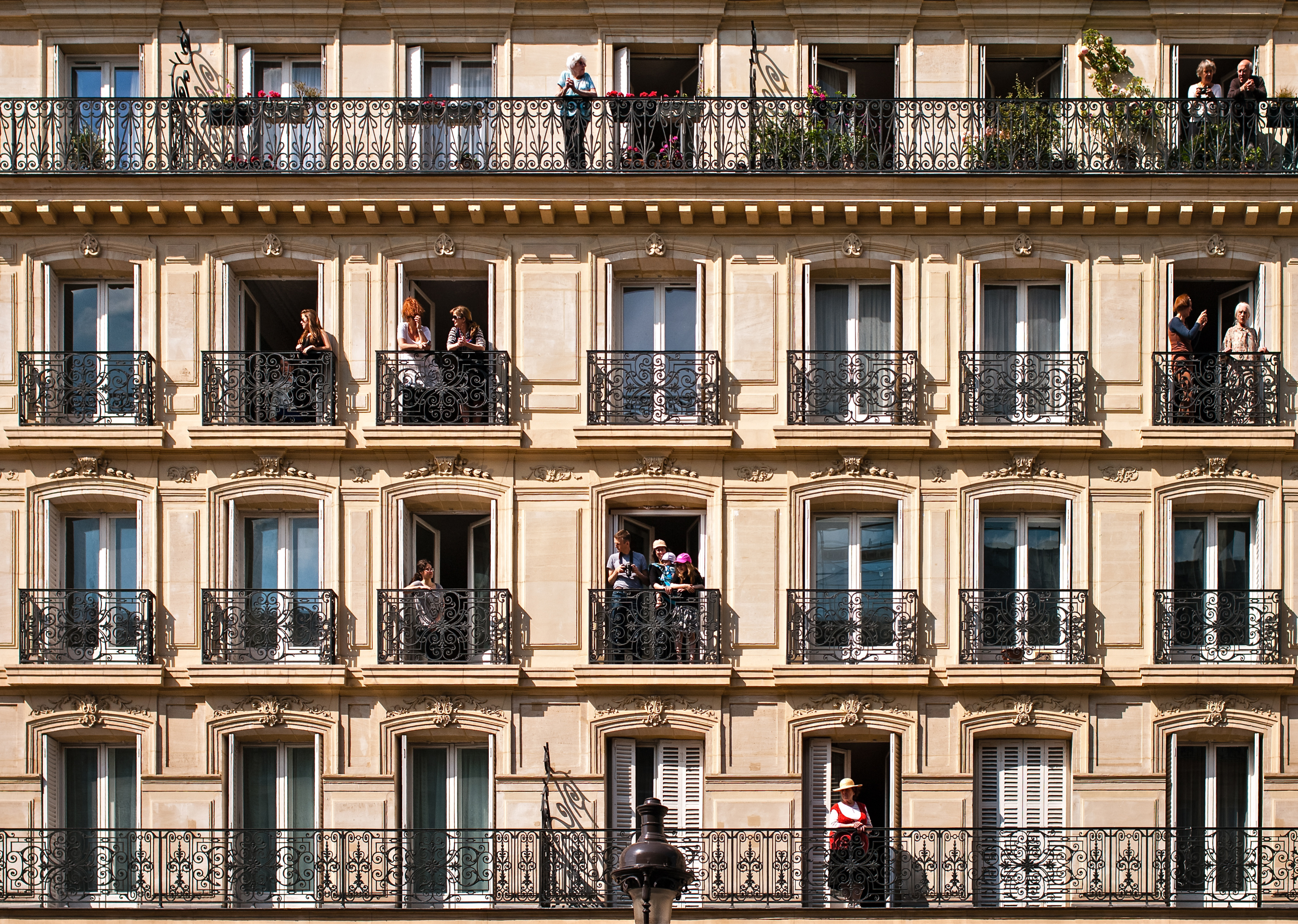
Windows and balconies of a typical Haussmannian building on Rue Soufflot

Haussmann's renovation of Paris (known in French as the travaux haussmanniens, [tʁavoz‿osmanjɛ̃], lit. 'Haussmannian works') was a vast public works programme commissioned by French Emperor Napoleon III and directed by his prefect of Seine, Georges-Eugène Haussmann, between 1853 and 1870.

It included the demolition of medieval neighbourhoods that were deemed overcrowded and unhealthy by officials at the time, the building of wide avenues, new parks and squares, the annexation of the suburbs surrounding Paris, and the construction of new sewers, fountains and aqueducts. Haussmann's work was met with fierce opposition, and he was ultimately dismissed by Napoleon III in 1870. The renovation allowed Paris to shine during the Belle Époque (1871–1914); work on his projects continued until 1927. The street plan and distinctive appearance of the centre of Paris today are largely the result of Haussmann's renovation.

Haussmann's renovation attracted a number of painters; the closest associated with that period remains Gustave Caillebotte, whose paintings of the transformed city are "unprecedented, [as] no artist had ever depicted Paris in this way".

== Background ==
=== Overcrowding, disease, crime and unrest in the centre of the old Paris ===
In the middle of the 19th century, the centre of Paris was viewed as overcrowded, dark, dangerous, and unhealthy. In 1845, the French social reformer Victor Considerant wrote: "Paris is an immense workshop of putrefaction, where misery, pestilence and sickness work in concert, where sunlight and air rarely penetrate. Paris is a terrible place where plants shrivel and perish, and where, of seven small infants, four die during the course of the year."

The street plan on the Île de la Cité and in the neighbourhood called the "quartier des Arcis", between the Louvre and the Hôtel de Ville (City Hall), had changed little since the Middle Ages. The population density in these neighbourhoods was extremely high, compared with the rest of Paris; in the neighbourhood of Champs-Élysées, population density was estimated at 5,380 per square kilometre (22 per acre); in the neighbourhoods of Arcis and Saint-Avoye, located in the present 3rd arrondissement, there was one inhabitant for every three square metres (32 sq ft).

In 1840, a doctor described one building in the Île de la Cité where a single 5-square-metre room (54 sq ft) on the fourth floor was occupied by twenty-three people, both adults and children. In these conditions, disease spread very quickly. Cholera epidemics ravaged the city in 1832 and 1848. In the epidemic of 1848, five percent of the inhabitants of these two neighbourhoods died.

Traffic circulation was another major problem. The widest streets in these two neighbourhoods were only 5 metres (16 ft) wide; the narrowest were one or two metres (3–7 feet) wide. Wagons, carriages and carts could barely move through the streets.

The centre of the city was also a cradle of discontent and revolution; between 1830 and 1848, seven armed uprisings and revolts had broken out in the centre of Paris, particularly along the Faubourg Saint-Antoine, around the Hôtel de Ville, and around Montagne Sainte-Geneviève on the left bank. The residents of these neighbourhoods had taken up pavement stones and blocked the narrow streets with barricades, which had to be dislodged by the army.

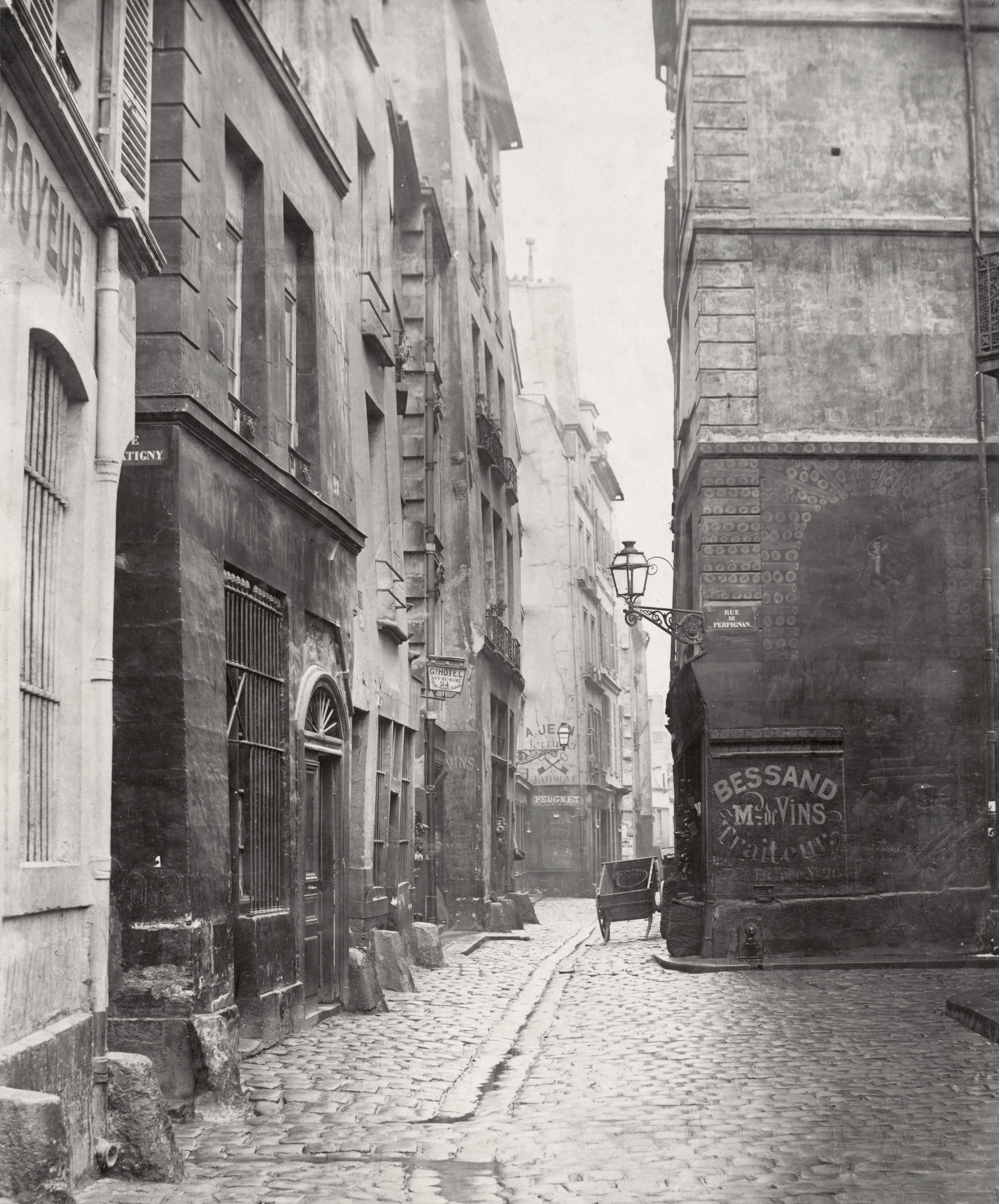
The Rue des Marmousets, one of the narrow and dark medieval streets on the Île de la Cité, in the 1850s. The site is near the Hôtel-Dieu (General Hospital on the Île de la Cité).

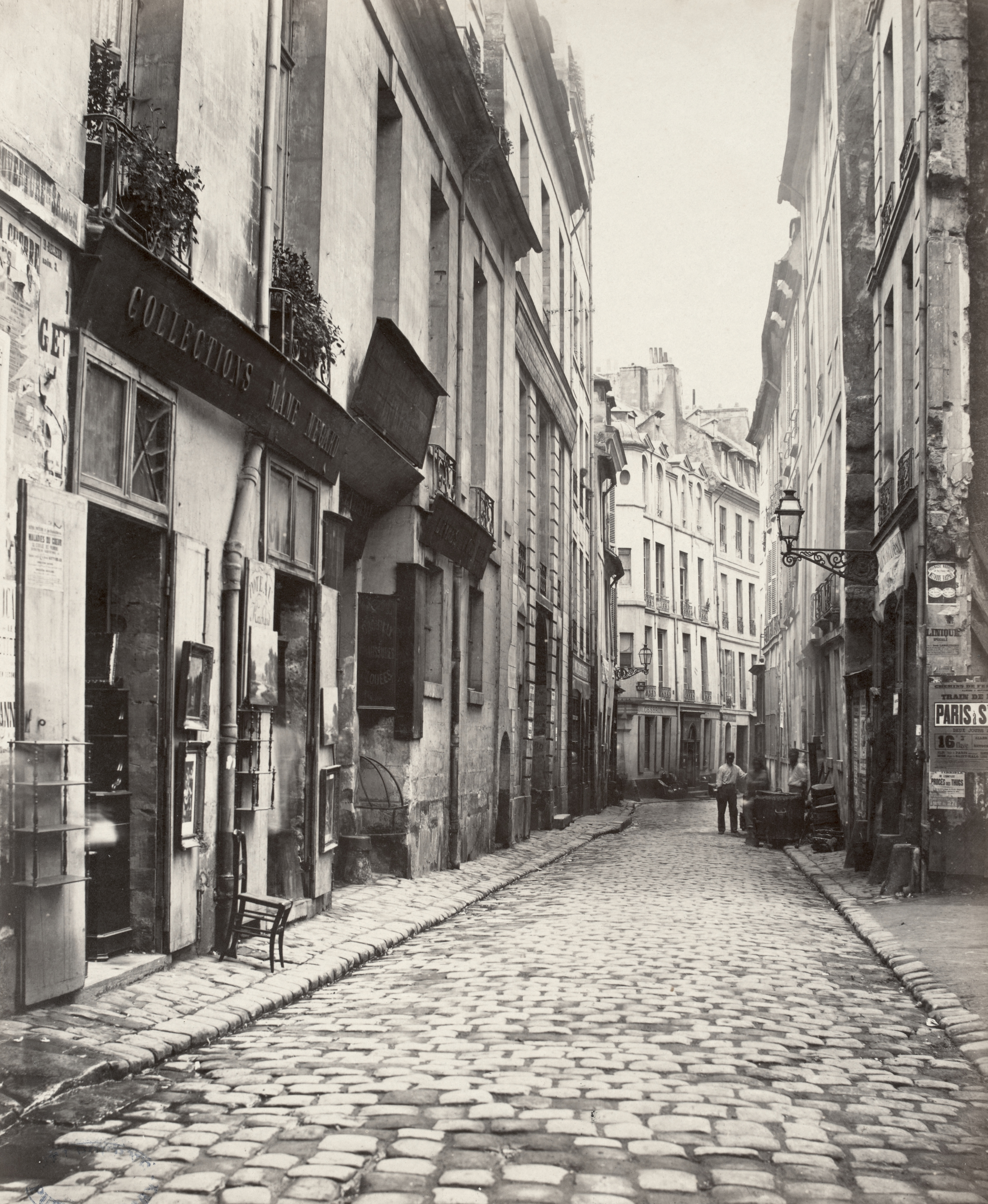
The Rue du Jardinet on the Left Bank, demolished by Haussmann to make room for Boulevard Saint-Germain

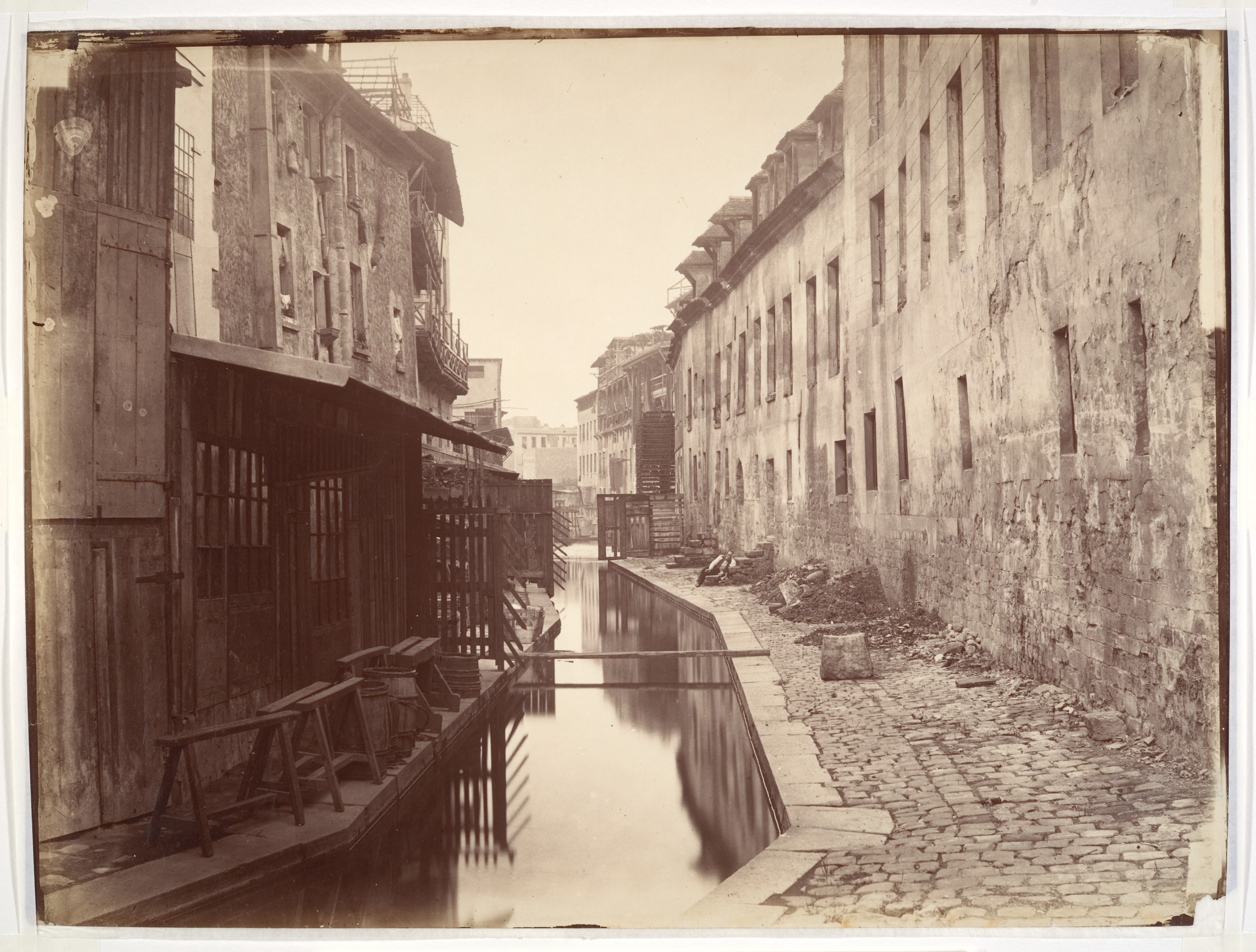
The Bièvre river was used to dump the waste from the tanneries of Paris; it emptied into the Seine.

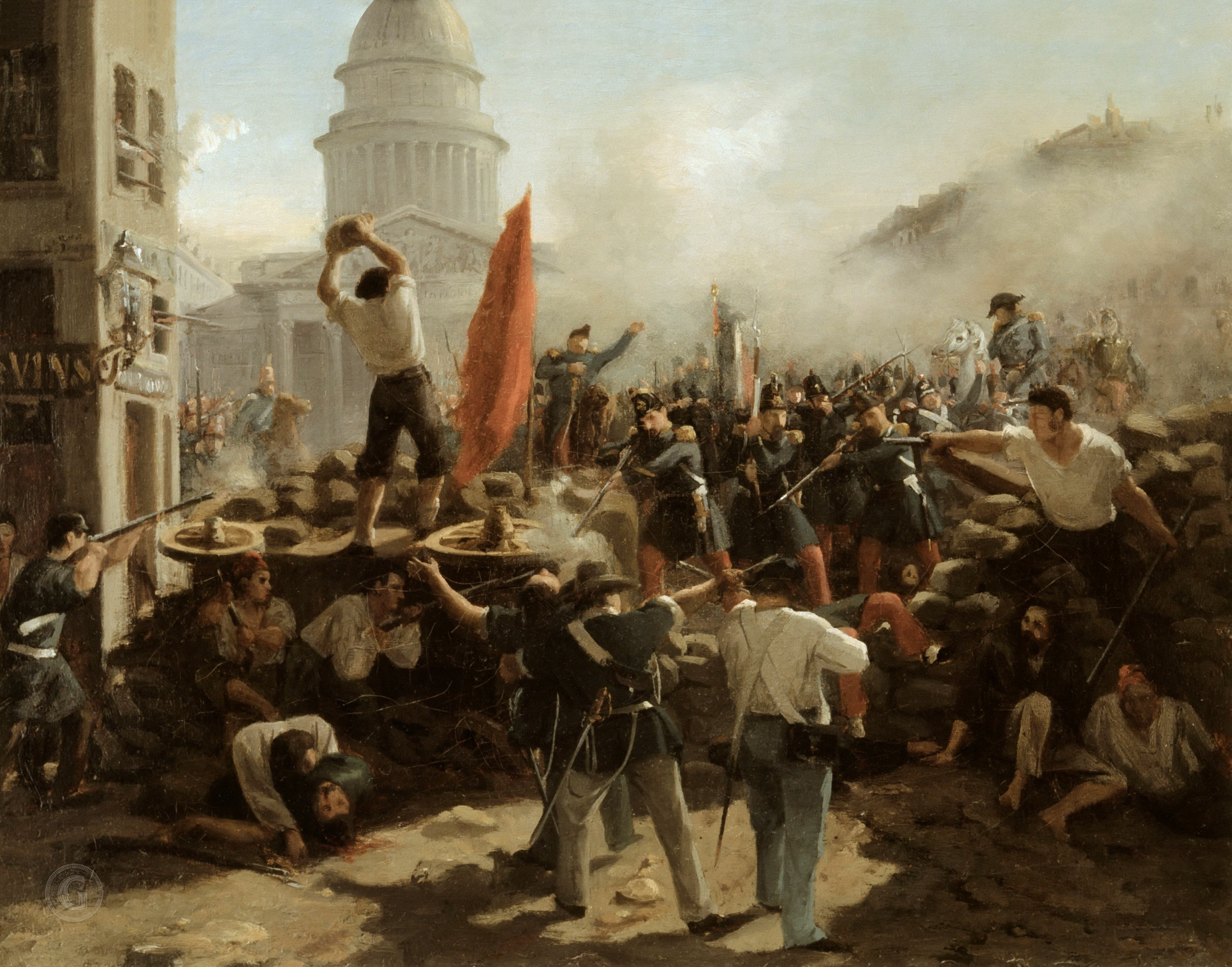
Barricade on Rue Soufflot during the 1848 Revolution. There were seven armed uprisings in Paris between 1830 and 1848, with barricades built in the narrow streets.

=== Earlier attempts to modernise the city ===
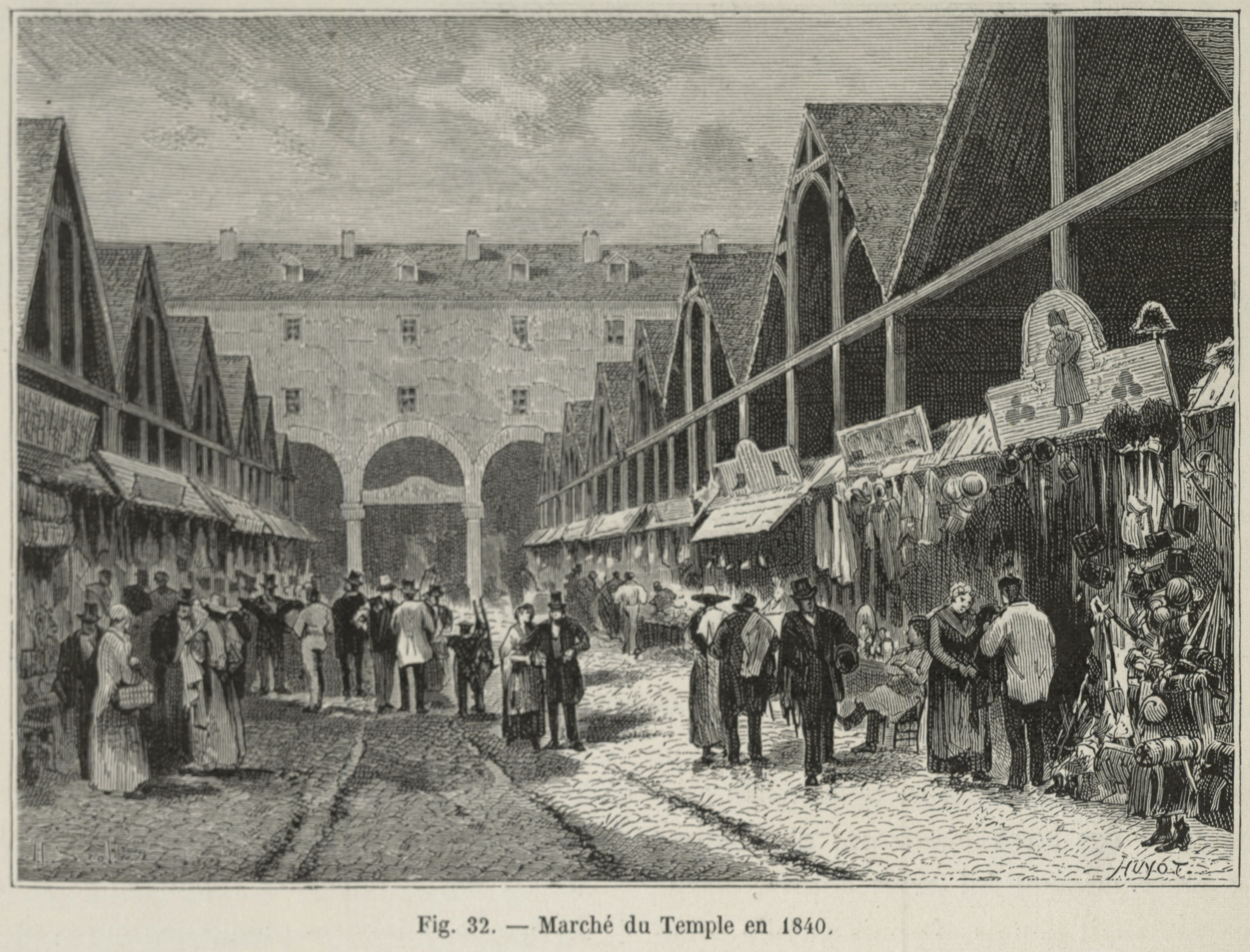
The second-hand clothing market, the Marché du Temple, in 1840, before Haussmann

The urban problems of Paris had been recognised in the 18th century; Voltaire complained about the markets "established in narrow streets, showing off their filthiness, spreading infection and causing continuing disorders." He wrote that the façade of the Louvre was admirable, "but it was hidden behind buildings worthy of the Goths and Vandals." He protested that the government "invested in futilities rather than investing in public works." In 1739 he wrote to the young Frederick the Great: "I saw the fireworks which they fired off with such management; would rather they started to have a Hôtel de Ville, beautiful squares, magnificent and convenient markets, beautiful fountains, before having fireworks."

The 18th-century architectural theorist and historian Quatremère de Quincy had proposed establishing or widening public squares in each of the neighbourhoods, expanding and developing the squares in front the Cathedral of Notre-Dame and the Church of Saint Gervais, and building a wide street to connect the Louvre with the Hôtel de Ville, the new city hall. Pierre-Louis Moreau-Desproux, the architect-in-chief of Paris, suggested paving and developing the embankments of the Seine, building monumental squares, clearing the space around landmarks, and cutting new streets.

In 1794, during the French Revolution, a Commission of Artists drafted an ambitious plan to build wide avenues, including a street in a straight line from the Place de la Nation to the Louvre, where the Avenue Victoria is today, and squares with avenues radiating in different directions, largely making use of land confiscated from the church during the Revolution, but all of these projects remained on paper.

Napoleon Bonaparte also had ambitious plans for rebuilding the city. He began work on a canal to bring fresh water to the city and began work on the Rue de Rivoli, beginning at the Place de la Concorde, but was able to extend it only to the Louvre before his downfall. "If only the heavens had given me twenty more years of rule and a little leisure," he wrote while in exile on Saint Helena, "one would vainly search today for the old Paris; nothing would remain of it but vestiges."

The medieval core and plan of Paris changed little during the restoration of the monarchy through the reign of King Louis-Philippe (1830–1848). It was the Paris of the narrow and winding streets and foul sewers described in the novels of Balzac and Hugo. In 1833, the new prefect of Seine under Louis-Philippe, Claude-Philibert Barthelot, comte de Rambuteau, made modest improvements to the sanitation and circulation of the city. He had new sewers constructed, though they still emptied directly into the Seine, and a better water supply system.

He constructed 180 kilometres of sidewalks, a new street, Rue Lobau; a new bridge over the Seine, the Pont Louis-Philippe; and cleared an open space around the Hôtel de Ville. He built a new street the length of the Île de la Cité and three additional streets across it: Rue d'Arcole, Rue de la Cité and Rue Constantine. To access the central market at Les Halles, he built a wide new street (today's Rue Rambuteau) and began work on Boulevard Malesherbes. On the Left Bank, he built a new street, Rue Soufflot, which cleared space around the Panthéon, and began work on the Rue des Écoles, between the École polytechnique and the Collège de France.

Rambuteau wanted to do more, but his budget and powers were limited. He did not have the power to easily expropriate property to build new streets, and the first law which required minimum health standards for Paris residential buildings was not passed until April 1850, under Louis-Napoléon Bonaparte, then president of the French Second Republic.

==== Comparison with London ====
Despite the effects brought about by the first wave of industrialisation in Britain, Paris lagged behind London in terms of urban development and improvements in the quality of life for its working-class citizens. The British government implemented a series of significant reforms and acts aimed at enhancing the living conditions of Londoners and other British cities. These initiatives included slum clearances that removed dilapidated housing, the construction of new public housing to accommodate the growing population, and ambitious infrastructure projects such as the introduction of the first modern sewage system. Additionally, the city saw the development of new transportation and the creation of public squares that served as communal gathering spaces.

London's growth was particularly remarkable given its medieval layout, which remained largely intact after the Great Fire of 1666. The city expanded rapidly, with the introduction of wide streets. New public squares emerged as vibrant centers of social life, while the establishment of expansive parks provided green spaces for recreation and relaxation. In comparison to Paris, London's urban planning and public amenities were more progressive.

The ambitious renovation and Haussmann's projects in Paris would have faced significant challenges if attempted in London. After the devastating Great Fire of 1666, various reconstruction plans emerged, notably one proposed by the renowned architect Christopher Wren, which aimed to create a city layout that could rival the grandeur of Paris's baroque design centuries earlier. King Charles II supported these initiatives, but ultimately, his authority was limited, and the strict property rights in England posed additional obstacles. In the 17th century, Britain was actively transitioning from an absolute monarchy to a constitutional monarchy, following the English Civil Wars, a shift that set it apart from France. Unlike the French monarchy, which wielded power to annex parts of cities like Paris and displace residents, the British monarch had limited authority. London evolved in a unique way, fostering a blend of social classes that coexisted rather than segregating into distinct communities as seen in Paris. The civil nature of British society and the role of Parliament played crucial roles in preventing such drastic changes from occurring.

As a result, the vision for a transformed London did not materialize, and the city was rebuilt largely in accordance with its medieval street patterns. However, the reconstruction did bring about some improvements that were advanced for their time, supported by the King and Parliament, that placed London already ahead of Paris centuries earlier. The new London featured wider streets that facilitated better traffic flow and public spaces, making the city more accessible and clean. Advances in public facilities, including the establishment of fresh water networks, improved the quality of life for its residents. While the medieval layout remained intact, these upgrades introduced more light in the urban environments. Slums were also cleaned in a more progressive nature, replaced by new public squares. Visitors from Paris after 1666 regularly wrote how impressed they were with a lighter, cleaner, and greener London.

=== Louis-Napoléon Bonaparte comes to power, and the rebuilding of Paris begins (1848–1852) ===
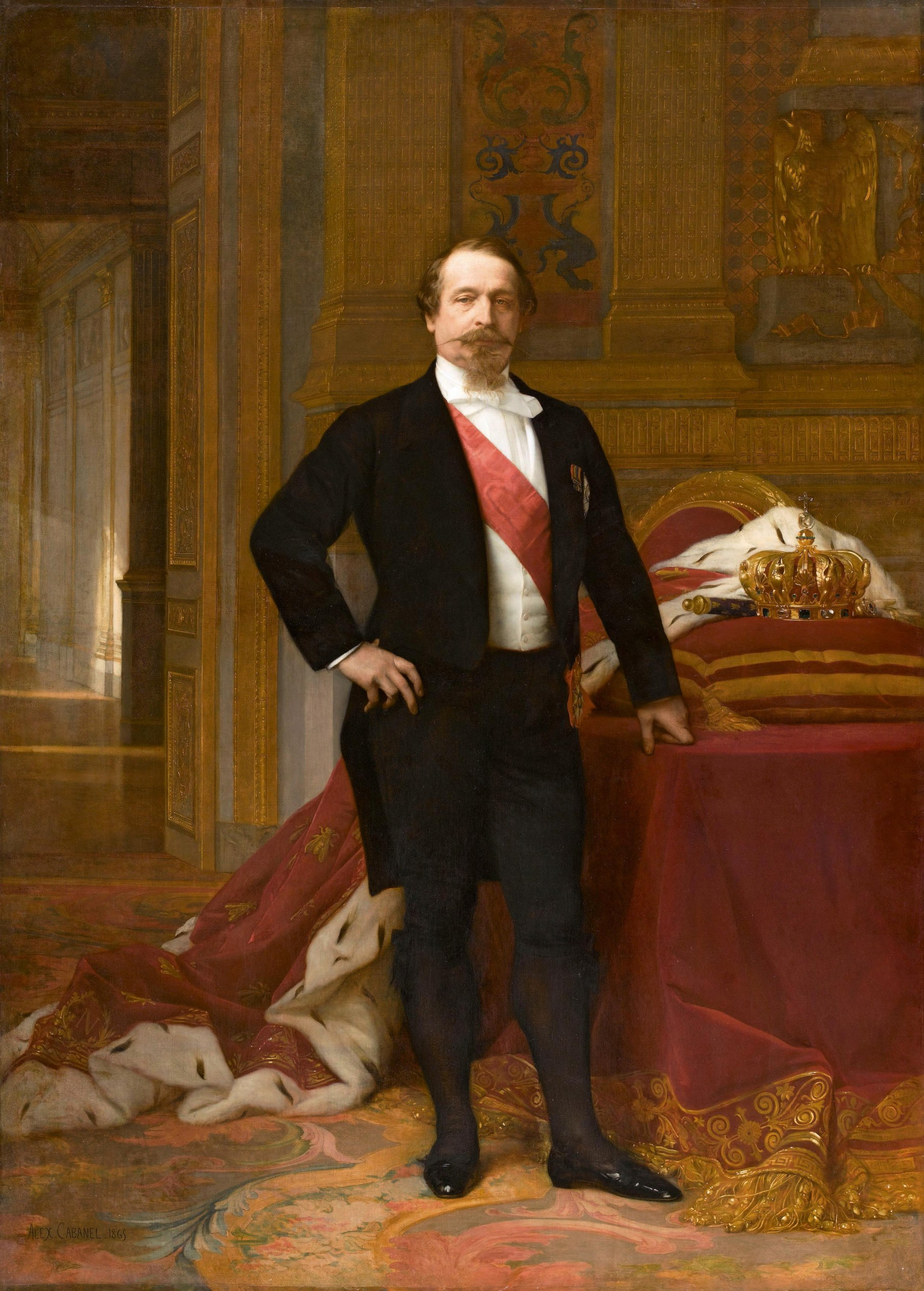
Napoléon III in 1865

King Louis-Philippe was overthrown in the February Revolution of 1848. On 10 December 1848, Louis-Napoléon Bonaparte, the nephew of Napoleon, won the first direct presidential elections ever held in France with an overwhelming 74.2 percent of the votes cast. He was elected largely because of his famous name, but also because of his promise to end poverty and improve the lives of ordinary people. Though he had been born in Paris, he had lived very little in the city; from the age of seven, he had lived in exile in Switzerland, England, and the United States, and for six years in prison in France for attempting to overthrow King Louis-Philippe. He had been especially impressed by London, with its wide streets, transport system, modern sewer system, public health improvements, squares and large public parks. In 1852 he gave a public speech declaring: "Paris is the heart of France. Let us apply our efforts to embellishing this great city. Let us open new streets, make the working class quarters, which lack air and light, more healthy, and let the beneficial sunlight reach everywhere within our walls".

As soon as he assumed the presidency, he supported the building of the first subsidised housing project for workers in Paris, the Cité-Napoléon, on Rue Rochechouart. He proposed the completion of the Rue de Rivoli from the Louvre to the Hôtel de Ville, completing the project begun by his uncle Napoleon, and he began a project which would transform the Bois de Boulogne (Boulogne Forest) into a large new public park, modelled after Hyde Park in London but much larger, on the west side of the city. He wanted both these projects to be completed before the end of his term in 1852, but became frustrated by the slow progress made by his prefect of Seine, Jean-Jacques Berger. The prefect was unable to move the work forward on the Rue de Rivoli quickly enough, and the original design for the Bois de Boulogne turned out to be a disaster; the architect, Jacques Ignace Hittorff, who had designed the Place de la Concorde for Louis-Philippe, followed Louis-Napoléon's instructions to imitate Hyde Park and designed two lakes connected by a stream for the new park, but forgot to take into account the difference of elevation between the two lakes. If they had been built, the one lake would have immediately emptied itself into the other.

At the end of 1851, shortly before Louis-Napoléon Bonaparte's term expired, neither the Rue de Rivoli nor the park had progressed very far. He wanted to run for re-election in 1852, but was blocked by the new Constitution, which limited him to one term. A majority of members of parliament voted to change the Constitution, but not the two-thirds majority required. Prevented from running again, Louis-Napoléon, with the help of the army, staged a coup d'état on 2 December 1851 and seized power. His opponents were arrested or exiled. The following year, on 2 December 1852, he declared himself Emperor, adopting the throne name Napoleon III.

== Haussmann's renovation ==
=== Haussmann begins work – the Croisée de Paris (1853–1859) ===
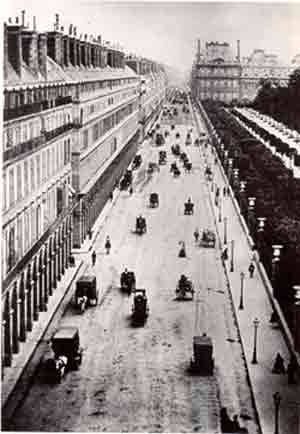
The Rue de Rivoli, shown here in 1855, was the first boulevard built by Haussmann, and it served as the model for the others.

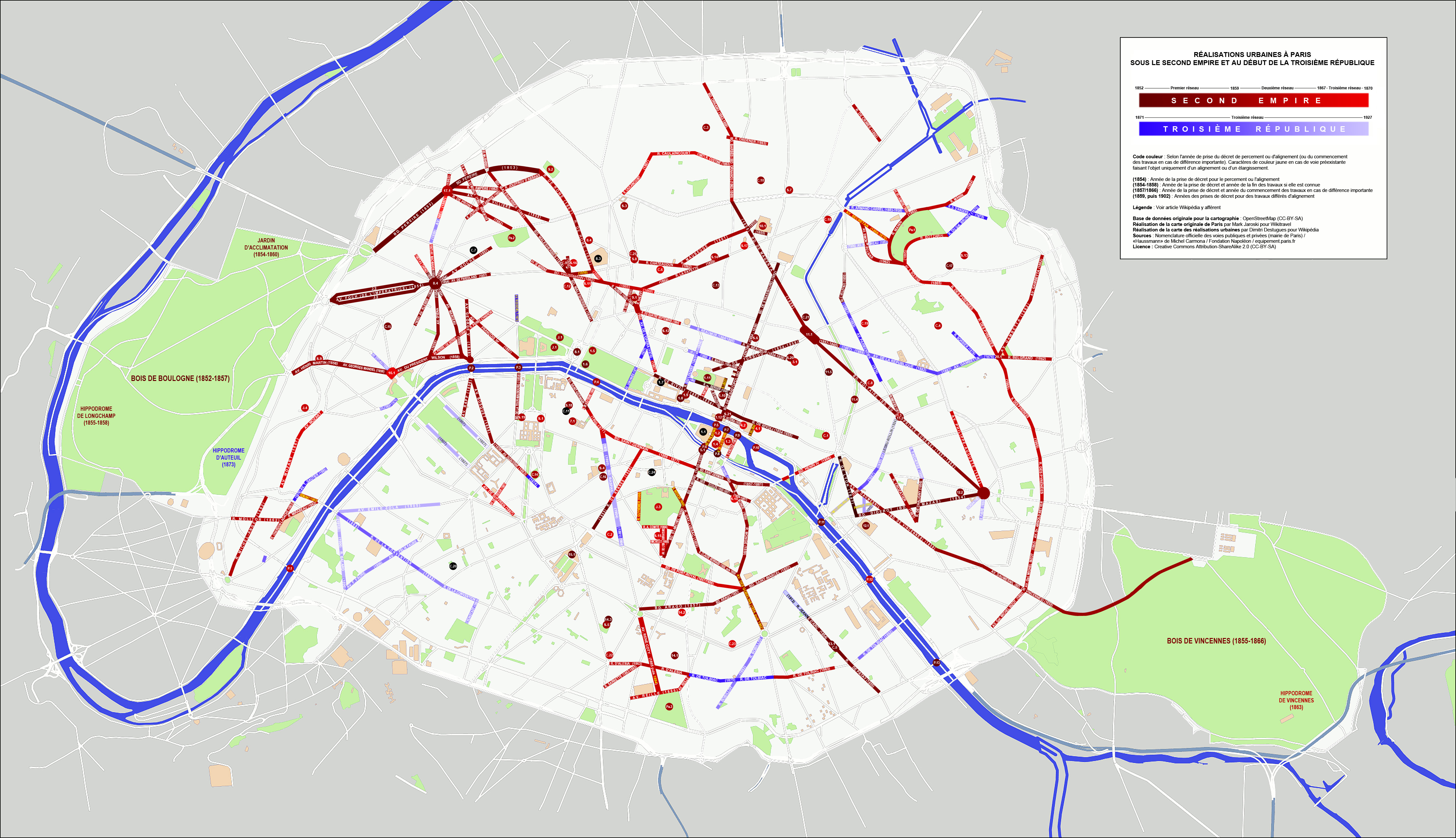
The boulevards and streets built by Napoleon III and Haussmann during the Second Empire are shown in red. They also built the Bois de Boulogne park (green area on the left), the Bois de Vincennes park containing a zoo (green area on the right), the Parc des Buttes Chaumont, the Parc Montsouris and dozens of smaller parks and squares.

Napoleon III dismissed Berger as the prefect of Seine and sought a more effective manager. His minister of the interior, Victor de Persigny, interviewed several candidates, and selected Georges-Eugène Haussmann, a native of Alsace and prefect of Gironde, who impressed Persigny with his energy, audacity, and ability to overcome or get around problems and obstacles. He became prefect of Seine on 22 June 1853, and on 29 June, the Emperor showed him the map of Paris and instructed Haussmann to aérer, unifier, et embellir Paris: to give it air and open space, to connect and unify the different parts of the city into one whole, and to make it more beautiful.

Haussmann went to work immediately on the first phase of the renovation desired by Napoleon III: completing the grande croisée de Paris, a great cross in the centre of Paris that would permit easier communication from east to west along the Rue de Rivoli and rue Saint-Antoine, and north–south communication along two new Boulevards, Strasbourg and Sébastopol. The grand cross had been proposed by the National Convention during the Revolution, and begun by Napoleon I; Napoleon III was determined to complete it. Completion of the Rue de Rivoli was given an even higher priority, because the Emperor wanted it finished before the opening of the 1855 Paris Universal Exposition, only two years away, and he wanted the project to include a new hotel, the Grand Hôtel du Louvre, the first large luxury hotel in the city, to house the Imperial guests at the Exposition.

Under the Emperor, Haussmann had greater power than any of his predecessors. In February 1851, the French Senate had simplified the laws on expropriation, giving him the authority to expropriate all the land on either side of a new street; and he did not have to report to the Parliament, only to the Emperor. The French parliament, controlled by Napoleon III, provided 50 million francs, but this was not nearly enough. Napoleon III appealed to the Péreire brothers, Émile and Isaac, two bankers who had created a new investment bank, Crédit Mobilier. The Péreire brothers organised a new company which raised 24 million francs to finance the construction of the street, in exchange for the rights to develop real estate along the route. This became a model for the building of all of Haussmann's future boulevards.

To meet the deadline, three thousand workers laboured on the new boulevard twenty-four hours a day. The Rue de Rivoli was completed, and the new hotel opened in March 1855, in time to welcome guests to the Exposition. The junction was made between the Rue de Rivoli and Rue Saint-Antoine; in the process, Haussmann restyled the Place du Carrousel, opened up a new square, Place Saint-Germain l'Auxerrois facing the colonnade of the Louvre, and reorganised the space between the Hôtel de Ville and the Place du Châtelet. Between the Hôtel de Ville and Bastille Square, he widened the rue Saint-Antoine; he was careful to save the historic Hôtel de Sully and Hôtel de Mayenne, but many other buildings, both medieval and modern, were knocked down to make room for the wider street, and several ancient, dark and narrow streets, Rue de l'Arche-Marion, rue du Chevalier-le-Guet and rue des Mauvaises-Paroles, disappeared from the map.

In 1855, work began on the north–south axis, beginning with the Boulevard de Strasbourg and Boulevard Sébastopol, which cut through the centre of some of the most crowded neighbourhoods in Paris, where the cholera epidemic had been the worst, between Rue Saint-Martin and Rue Saint-Denis. "It was the gutting of old Paris," Haussmann wrote with satisfaction in his Memoires, "of the neighborhood of riots, and of barricades, from one end to the other." Boulevard Sébastopol ended at the new Place du Châtelet; a new bridge, the Pont-au-Change, was constructed across the Seine, and crossed the island on a newly built street. On the left bank, the north–south axis was continued by Boulevard Saint-Michel, which was cut in a straight line from the Seine to the Observatory, and then, as the Rue d'Enfer, extended all the way to the Rue d'Orléans. The north–south axis was completed in 1859.

The two axes crossed at the Place du Châtelet, making it the centre of Haussmann's Paris. Haussmann widened the square, moved the Fontaine du Palmier, built by Napoleon I, to the centre and built two new theatres, facing each other across the square; the Cirque Impérial (now the Théâtre du Châtelet) and the Théâtre Lyrique (now Théâtre de la Ville).

=== The second phase – a network of new boulevards (1859–1867) ===
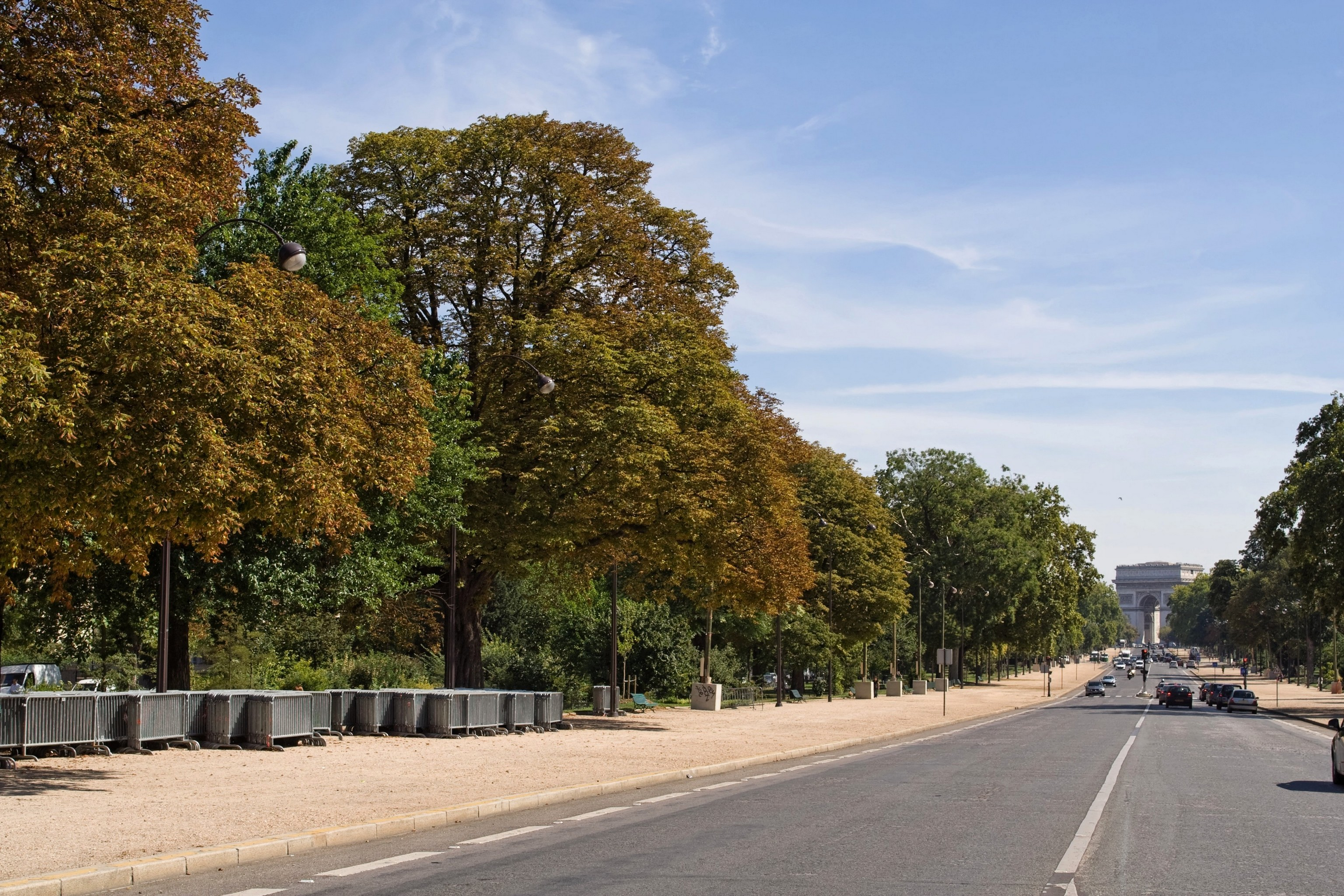
The tree-lined avenue de l'Impératrice (now avenue Foch) was designed by Haussmann as the grand entrance to the Bois de Boulogne.

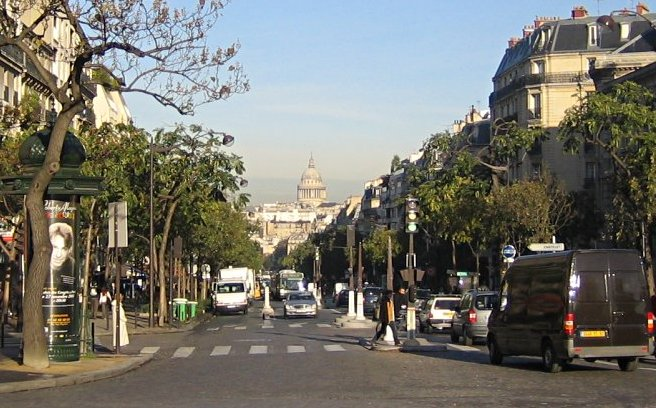
The new avenue des Gobelins on the left bank opened a view to the Panthéon.

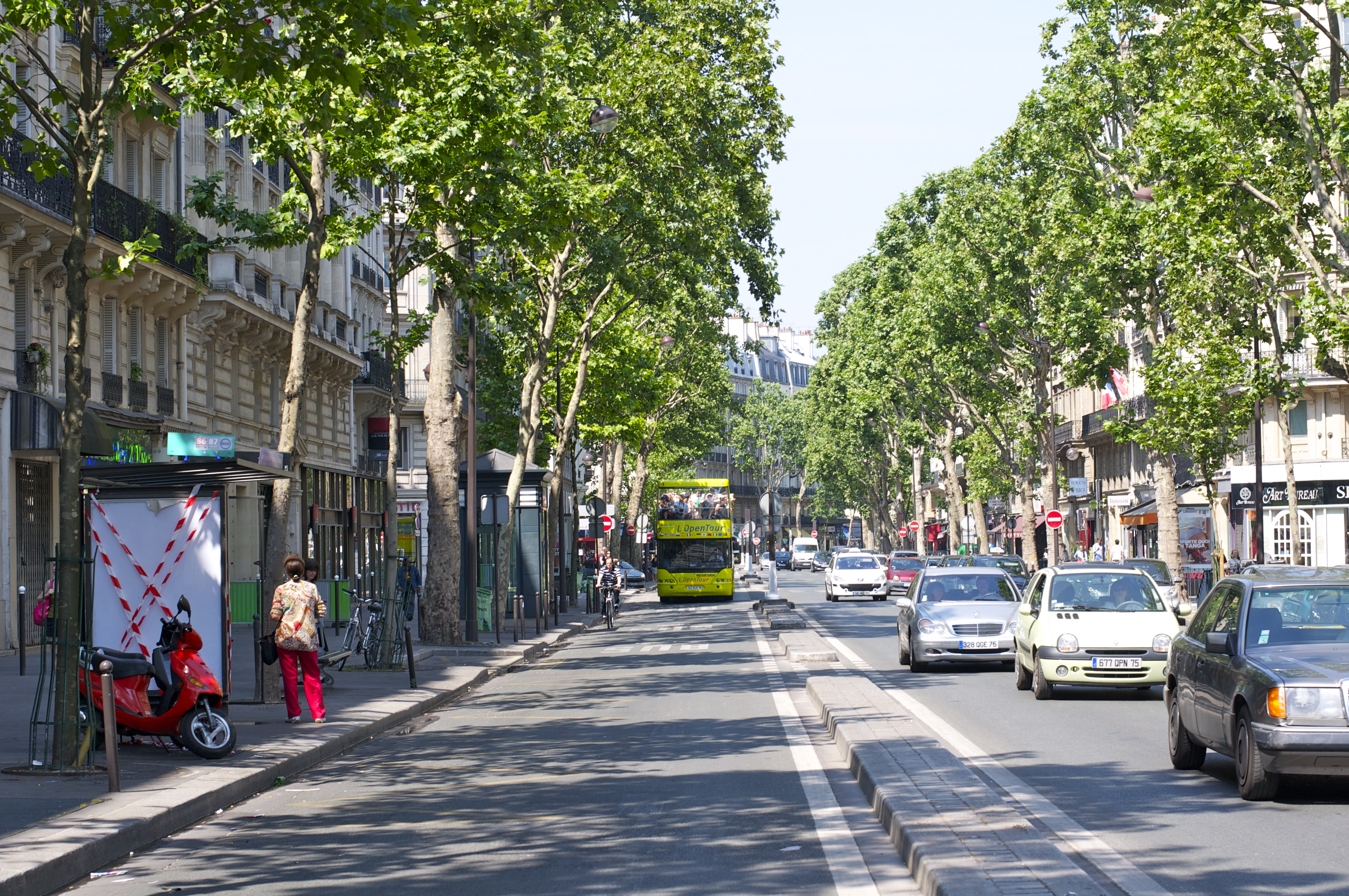
Haussmann's Boulevard Saint-Germain was designed as the main east–west axis of the left bank.

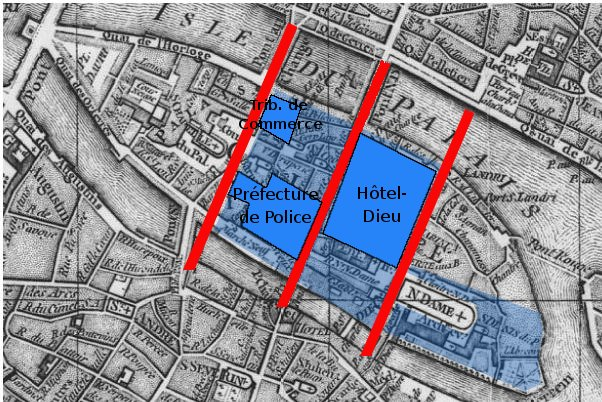
The Île de la Cité transformed by Haussmann: new transverse streets (red), public spaces (light blue) and buildings (dark blue)

In the first phase of his renovation Haussmann constructed 9,467 metres (6 miles) of new boulevards, at a net cost of 278 million francs. The official parliamentary report of 1859 found that it had "brought air, light and healthiness and procured easier circulation in a labyrinth that was constantly blocked and impenetrable, where streets were winding, narrow, and dark." It had employed thousands of workers, and most Parisians were pleased by the results. His second phase, approved by the Emperor and parliament in 1858 and begun in 1859, was much more ambitious. He intended to build a network of wide boulevards to connect the interior of Paris with the ring of grand boulevards built by Louis XVIII during the restoration, and to the new railroad stations which Napoleon III considered the real gates of the city. He planned to construct 26,294 metres (16 miles) of new avenues and streets, at a cost of 180 million francs. Haussmann's plan called for the following:

On the right bank:

- The construction of a large new square, place du Chateau-d'Eau (the modern Place de la République). This involved demolishing the famous theatre street known as "le boulevard du Crime", made famous in the film Les Enfants du Paradis; and the construction of three new major streets: the boulevard du Prince Eugène (the modern boulevard Voltaire); the boulevard de Magenta and rue Turbigo. Boulevard Voltaire became one of the longest streets in the city, and became the central axis of the eastern neighbourhoods of the city. It would end at the place du Trône (the modern Place de la Nation).
- The extension of boulevard Magenta to connect it with the new railway station, the Gare du Nord.
- The construction of boulevard Malesherbes, to connect the Place de la Madeleine to the new Monceau neighbourhood. The construction of this street obliterated one of the most sordid and dangerous neighbourhoods in the city, called la Petite Pologne, where Paris policemen rarely ventured at night.
- A new square, place de l'Europe, in front of the Gare Saint-Lazare railway station. The station was served by two new boulevards, rue de Rome and rue Saint-Lazare. In addition, the rue de Madrid was extended and two other streets, rue de Rouen (the modern rue Auber) and rue Halevy, were built in this neighbourhood.
- Parc Monceau was redesigned and replanted, and part of the old park made into a residential quarter.
- The rue de Londres and rue de Constantinople, under a new name, avenue de Villiers, was extended to porte Champerret.
- The Étoile, around the Arc de Triomphe, was completely redesigned. A star of new avenues radiated from the Étoile; avenue de Bezons (now avenue de Wagram); avenue Kléber; avenue Josephine (now avenue Marceau); avenue Prince-Jerome (now avenues Mac-Mahon and Niel); avenue Essling (now Carnot); and a wider avenue de Saint-Cloud (now avenue Victor-Hugo), forming with Champs-Elysées and other existing avenues a star of 12 avenues.
- Avenue Daumesnil was built as far as the new Bois de Vincennes, a huge new park being constructed on the east edge of the city.
- The hill of Chaillot was leveled, and a new square created at the Pont de l'Alma. Three new boulevards were built in this neighbourhood: avenue d'Alma (the present avenue George V); avenue de l'Empereur (the present avenue du President-Wilson), which connected the places d'Alma, d'Iena and du Trocadéro. In addition, four new streets were built in that neighbourhood: rue Francois-I^{er}, rue Pierre Charron, rue Marbeuf and rue de Marignan.

On the left bank:

- Two new boulevards, avenue Bosquet and avenue Rapp, were constructed, beginning from the pont de l'Alma.
- The avenue de la Tour Maubourg was extended as far as the pont des Invalides.
- A new street, boulevard Arago, was constructed, to open up Place Denfert-Rochereau.
- A new street, boulevard d'Enfer (today's boulevard Raspail) was built up to the intersection Sèvres–Babylone.
- The streets around the Panthéon on Montagne Sainte-Geneviève were extensively changed. A new street, avenue des Gobelins, was created, and part of rue Mouffetard was expanded. Another new street, rue Monge, was created on the east, while another new street, rue Claude Bernard, on the south. Rue Soufflot, built by Rambuteau, was entirely rebuilt.

On the Île de la Cité:

The island became an enormous construction site, which completely destroyed most of the old streets and neighbourhoods. Two new government buildings, the Tribunal de Commerce and the Préfecture de Police, were built, occupying a large part of the island. Two new streets were also built, the boulevard du Palais and the rue de Lutèce. Two bridges, the pont Saint-Michel and the pont au Change were completely rebuilt, along with the embankments near them. The Palais de Justice and Place Dauphine were extensively modified. At the same time, Haussmann preserved and restored the jewels of the island; the square in front of the Cathedral of Notre Dame was widened, the spire of the cathedral, pulled down during the Revolution, was restored, whilst Sainte-Chapelle and the ancient Conciergerie were saved and restored.

The grand projects of the second phase were mostly welcomed, but also caused criticism. Haussmann was especially criticized for his taking large parts of the Jardin du Luxembourg to make room for the present-day boulevard Raspail, and for its connection with the boulevard Saint-Michel. The Medici Fountain had to be moved further into the park, and was reconstructed with the addition of statuary and a long basin of water. Haussmann was also criticized for the growing cost of his projects; the estimated cost for the 26,290 metres (86,250 ft) of new avenues had been 180 million francs, but grew to 410 million francs; property owners whose buildings had been expropriated won a legal case entitling them to larger payments, and many property owners found ingenious ways to increase the value of their expropriated properties by inventing non-existent shops and businesses, and charging the city for lost revenue.

Haussmann found creative ways to raise more money for the grand projects while circumventing the Legislative Assembly, whose approval was otherwise needed for direct borrowing increases. The City of Paris began paying its contractors on the new works projects with vouchers instead of money; the vouchers were then purchased from the contractors by the city's lenders, mainly the mortgage bank Crédit Foncier. In this way Haussmann indirectly raised 463 million francs by 1867; 86% of this debt was owned by Crédit Foncier. This debt conveniently did not have to be included on the city's balance sheets. Another method was the creation of a fund, the Caisse des Travaux de Paris, decreed by Napoleon III on 14 November 1858. Ostensibly it was intended to give the city greater freedom in executing the grand projects. Revenue from the sale of materials salvaged from the demolitions and the sale of lots left over from the expropriations went into this fund, amounting to some 365 million francs between 1859 and 1869. The fund expended much more than it took in, some 1.2 billion francs towards the grand projects during the ten years it existed. To offset some of the deficit, which the City of Paris was responsible for, Haussmann issued 100 million francs in securities from the fund guaranteed by the city. He only needed the approval of the city council to raise this new sum, and, like the voucher scheme, the securities were not included in the city's official debt obligations.

=== Paris doubles in size – the annexation of 1860 ===
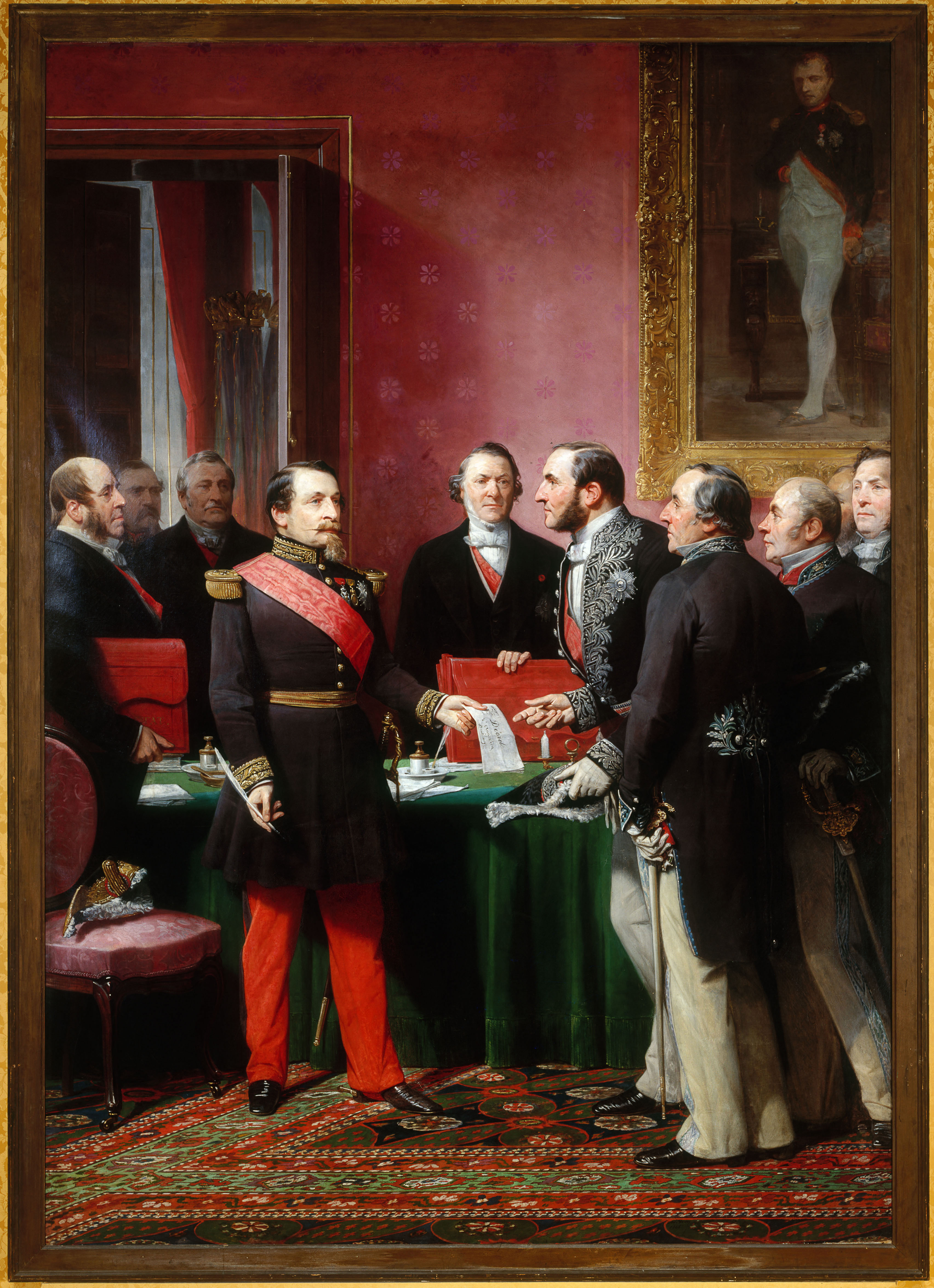
Haussmann presents Emperor Napoleon III the documents for the annexation of the Paris suburbs.

On 1 January 1860 Napoleon III officially annexed the suburbs of Paris out to the ring of fortifications around the city. The annexation included eleven communes; Auteuil, Batignolles-Monceau, Montmartre, La Chapelle, Passy, La Villette, Belleville, Charonne, Bercy, Grenelle and Vaugirard, along with pieces of other outlying towns. The residents of these suburbs were not entirely happy to be annexed; they did not want to pay the higher taxes, and wanted to keep their independence, but they had no choice; Napoleon III was Emperor, and he could arrange boundaries as he wished. Haussmann was keen to expand the boundaries as well, since the enlarged tax base would provide vital funding for the public works then underway. Numerous factories and workshops had been established in the suburbs, some to specifically avoid paying the Octroi, a tax on goods and materials paid at entry points into Paris. With the annexation, these facilities now had to pay tax on the raw materials and fuel they used. This was a deliberate way of discouraging the development of heavy industry in the environs of Paris, which neither Haussmann nor the city council wished to take root.

With the annexation Paris was enlarged from twelve to twenty arrondissements, the number today. The annexation more than doubled the area of the city from 3,300 hectares to 7,100 hectares, and the population of Paris instantly grew by 400,000 to 1,600,000 people. The annexation made it necessary for Haussmann to enlarge his plans, and to construct new boulevards to connect the new arrondissements with the centre. In order to connect Auteuil and Passy to the centre of Paris, he built rues Michel-Ange, Molitor and Mirabeau. To connect the plain of Monceau, he built avenues Villers, Wagram, and boulevard Malesherbes. To reach the northern arrondissements he extended Boulevard Magenta with boulevard d'Ornano as far as the Porte de la Chapelle, and in the east extended the rue des Pyrénées.

=== The third phase and mounting criticism (1869–1870) ===
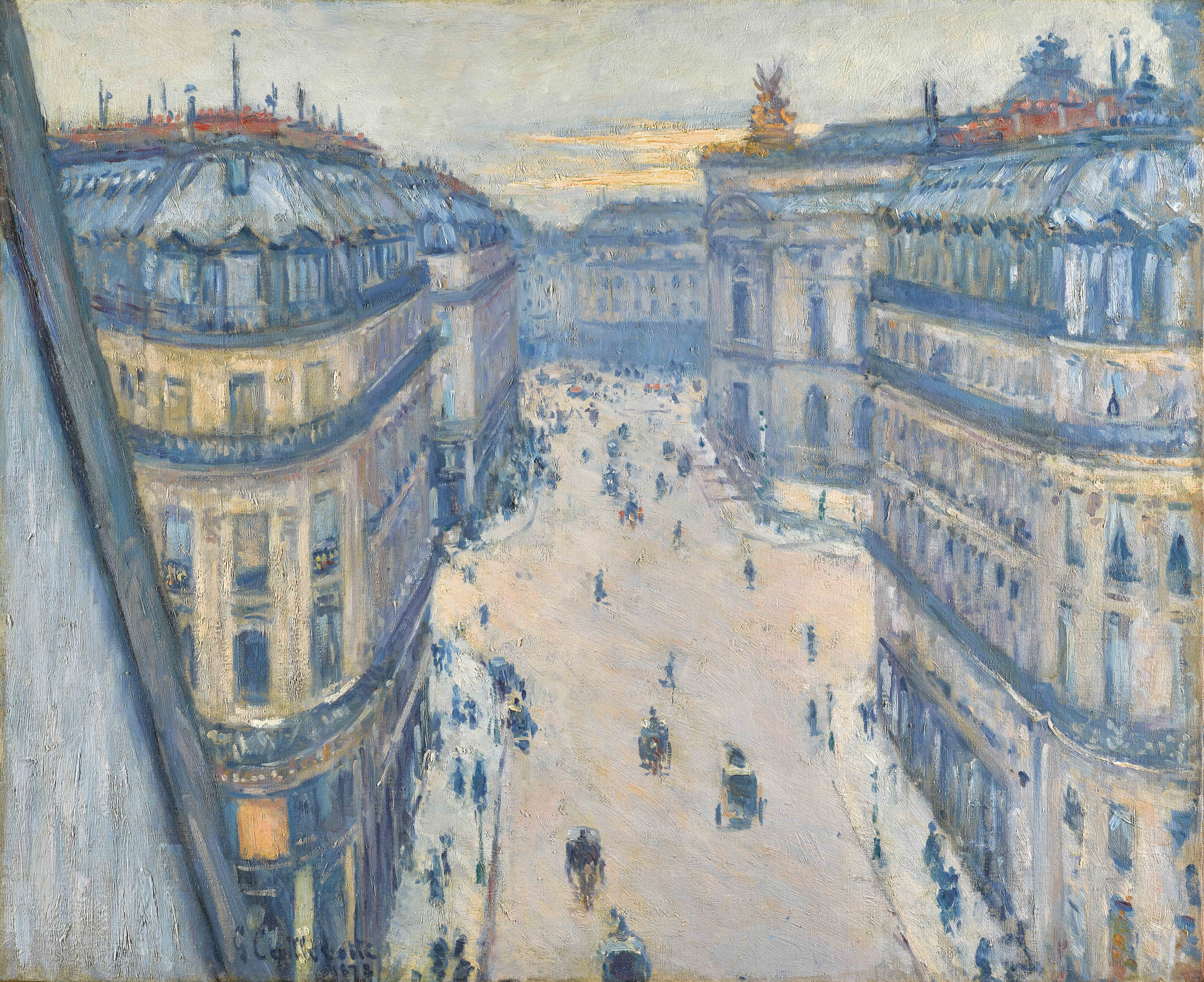
Rue Halévy, From the 6th Floor. Gustave Caillebotte, 1878

The third phase of renovations was proposed in 1867 and approved in 1869, but it faced much more opposition than the earlier phases. Napoleon III had decided to liberalise his empire in 1860, and to give a greater voice to the parliament and to the opposition. The Emperor had always been less popular in Paris than in the rest of the country, and the republican opposition in parliament focused its attacks on Haussmann. Haussmann ignored the attacks and went ahead with the third phase, which planned the construction of twenty-eight kilometers (17 miles) of new boulevards at an estimated cost of 280 million francs.

The third phase included these projects on the right bank:

- The renovation of the Jardins des Champs-Élysées.
- Finishing the Place du Château d'Eau (now Place de la République), creating a new Avenue des Amandiers and extending Avenue Parmentier.
- Finishing the Place du Trône (now Place de la Nation) and opening three new boulevards: Avenue Philippe-Auguste, Avenue Taillebourg, and Avenue de Bouvines.
- Extending the Rue Caulaincourt and preparing a future Pont Caulaincourt.
- Building a new Rue de Châteaudon and clearing the space around the church of Notre-Dame de Lorette, making room for connection between the Gare Saint-Lazare, the Gare du Nord and Gare de l'Est. In view of these construction projects, the Hôtel Bonaparte was already demolished in 1857.
- Finishing the place in front of the Gare du Nord. Rue Maubeuge was extended from Montmartre to the Boulevard de la Chapelle, and Rue La Fayette was extended to the Porte de Pantin.
- The Place de l'Opéra had been created during the first and second phases; the opera itself was to be built in the third phase.
- Extending Boulevard Haussmann from the Place Saint-Augustin to Rue Taitbout, connecting the new quarter of the Opera with that of Étoile.
- Creating the Place du Trocadéro, the starting point of two new avenues, the modern President-Wilson and Henri-Martin.
- Creating the Place Victor-Hugo, the starting point of avenues de Malakoff and Bugeaud and rues Boissière and Copernic.
- Finishing the Rond-Point of the Champs-Élysées, with the construction of the Avenue d'Antin (now Franklin-Roosevelt) and Rue La Boétie.

On the left bank:

- Building the Boulevard Saint-Germain from the Pont de la Concorde to the Rue du Bac; building the Rue des Saints-Pères and Rue de Rennes.
- Extending the Rue de la Glacière and enlarging Place Monge.

Haussmann did not have time to finish the third phase, as he soon came under intense attack from the opponents of Napoleon III.

=== The downfall of Haussmann (1870) and completion of his work (1927) ===
In 1867, one of the leaders of the parliamentary opposition to Napoleon, Jules Ferry, ridiculed the accounting practices of Haussmann as Les Comptes fantastiques d'Haussmann ("The fantastic (bank) accounts of Haussmann"), a play-on-words based on the play Les Contes fantastiques d'Hoffmann. In the autumn of 1867, the voucher program was ruled as official debt by the Court of Accounts, rather than as the "deferred payments" which Haussmann argued they were. This made the voucher scheme illegal, since the City of Paris had not obtained the permission of the Legislative Assembly before borrowing. The city was forced to enter into renegotiations with the Crédit Foncier to convert the vouchers into regular debt. Two separate agreements were made with the Crédit Foncier; the city agreed to repay 465 million francs in total over 40 years and 39 years respectively. The debates in the Legislative Assembly surrounding the authorization of these new agreements lasted 11 sessions, with critics attacking Haussmann's borrowing, his questionable funding mechanisms, and the City of Paris's governing structure. The result was a new law, passed on April 18, 1868, which gave the Legislative Assembly oversight of the city's finances.

In the parliamentary elections of May 1869, the government candidates won 4.43 million votes, while the opposition republicans won 3.35 million votes. In Paris, the republican candidates won 234,000 votes to 77,000 for the Bonapartist candidates, and took eight of the nine seats of Paris deputies. At the same time Napoleon III was increasingly ill, suffering from gallstones which were to cause his death in 1873, and preoccupied by the political crisis that would lead to the Franco-Prussian War. In December 1869 Napoleon III named an opposition leader and fierce critic of Haussmann, Emile Ollivier, as his new prime minister. Napoleon gave in to the opposition demands in January 1870 and asked Haussmann to resign. Haussmann refused to resign, and the Emperor reluctantly dismissed him on 5 January 1870. Eight months later, during the Franco-Prussian War, Napoleon III was captured by the Germans, and the Empire was overthrown.

In his memoirs, written many years later, Haussmann had this comment on his dismissal: "In the eyes of the Parisians, who like routine in things but are changeable when it comes to people, I committed two great wrongs: Over the course of seventeen years, I disturbed their daily habits by turning Paris upside down, and they had to look at the same face of the Prefect in the Hôtel de Ville. These were two unforgivable complaints."

Haussmann's successor as prefect of Seine appointed Adolphe Alphand, the head of Haussmann's department of parks and plantations, as the director of works of Paris. Alphand respected the basic concepts of his plan. Despite their intense criticism of Napoleon III and Haussmann during the Second Empire, the leaders of the new Third Republic continued and finished his renovation projects.

- 1875: completion of the Paris Opéra
- 1877: completion of the boulevard Saint-Germain
- 1877: completion of the avenue de l'Opéra
- 1879: completion of the boulevard Henri IV
- 1889: completion of the avenue de la République
- 1907: completion of the boulevard Raspail
- 1927: completion of the boulevard Haussmann

=== Green space – parks and gardens ===
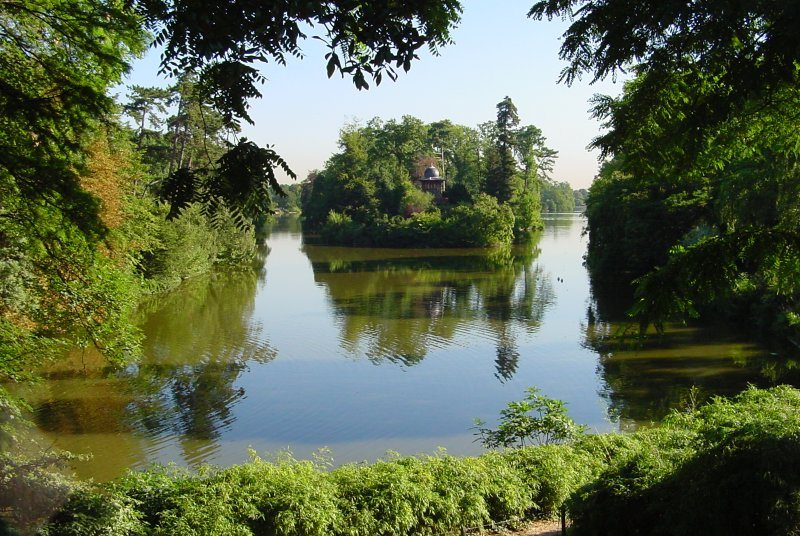
The Bois de Boulogne (1852–1858) was inspired by Hyde Park in London, and was designed to provide rest and relaxation for families of all classes of Parisians.

Prior to Haussmann, Paris had only four public parks: the Jardin des Tuileries, the Jardin du Luxembourg, and the Palais Royal, all in the centre of the city, and the Parc Monceau, the former property of the family of King Louis Philippe, in addition to the Jardin des Plantes, the city's botanical garden and oldest park. Napoleon III had already begun construction of the Bois de Boulogne, and wanted to build more new parks and gardens for the recreation and relaxation of the Parisians, particularly those in the new neighbourhoods of the expanding city. Napoleon III's new parks were inspired by his memories of the parks in London, especially Hyde Park, where he had strolled and promenaded in a carriage while in exile; but he wanted to build on a much larger scale. Working with Haussmann, Adolphe Alphand, the engineer who headed the new Service of Promenades and Plantations, whom Haussmann brought with him from Bordeaux, and his new chief gardener, Jean-Pierre Barillet-Deschamps, also from Bordeaux, laid out a plan for four major parks at the cardinal points of the compass around the city. Thousands of workers and gardeners began to dig lakes, build cascades, plant lawns, flowerbeds and trees. construct chalets and grottoes. Haussmann and Alphand created the Bois de Boulogne (1852–1858) to the west of Paris: the Bois de Vincennes (1860–1865) to the east; the Parc des Buttes Chaumont (1865–1867) to the north, and Parc Montsouris (1865–1878) to the south. In addition to building the four large parks, Haussmann and Alphand redesigned and replanted the city's older parks, including Parc Monceau, and the Jardin du Luxembourg. Altogether, in seventeen years, they planted six hundred thousand trees and added two thousand hectares of parks and green space to Paris. Never before had a city built so many parks and gardens in such a short time.

Under Louis Philippe, a single public square had been created, at the tip of the Ile-de-la-Cité. Haussmann wrote in his memoirs that Napoleon III instructed him: "do not miss an opportunity to build, in all the arrondissements of Paris, the greatest possible number of squares, in order to offer the Parisians, as they have done in London, places for relaxation and recreation for all the families and all the children, rich and poor." In response Haussmann created twenty-four new squares; seventeen in the older part of the city, eleven in the new arrondissements, adding 15 hectares (37 acres) of green space. Alphand termed these small parks "green and flowering salons". Haussmann's goal was to have one park in each of the eighty neighbourhoods of Paris, so that no one was more than ten minutes' walk from such a park. The parks and squares were an immediate success with all classes of Parisians.

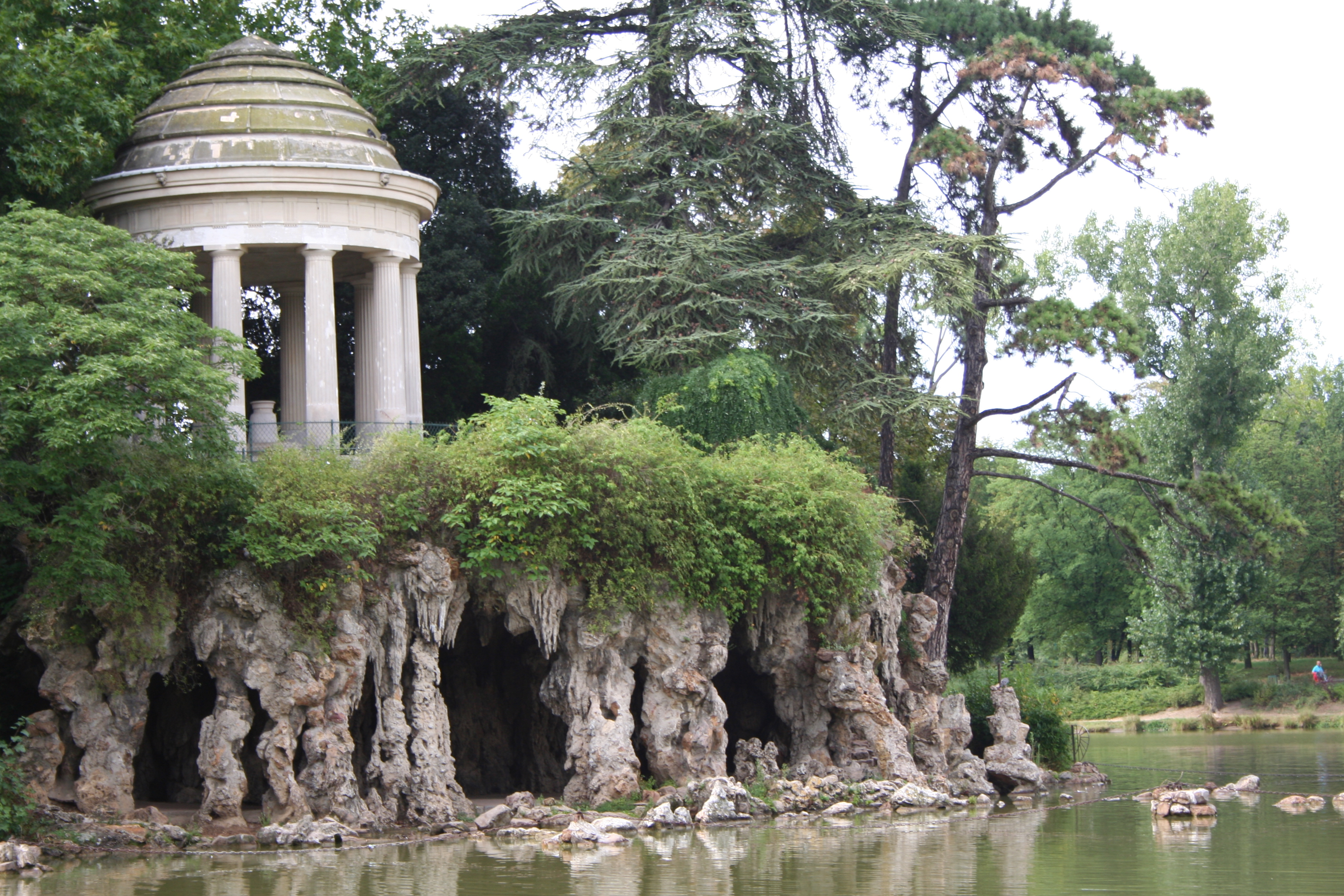
The Bois de Vincennes (1860–1865) was (and is today) the largest park in Paris, designed to give green space to the working-class population of east Paris.

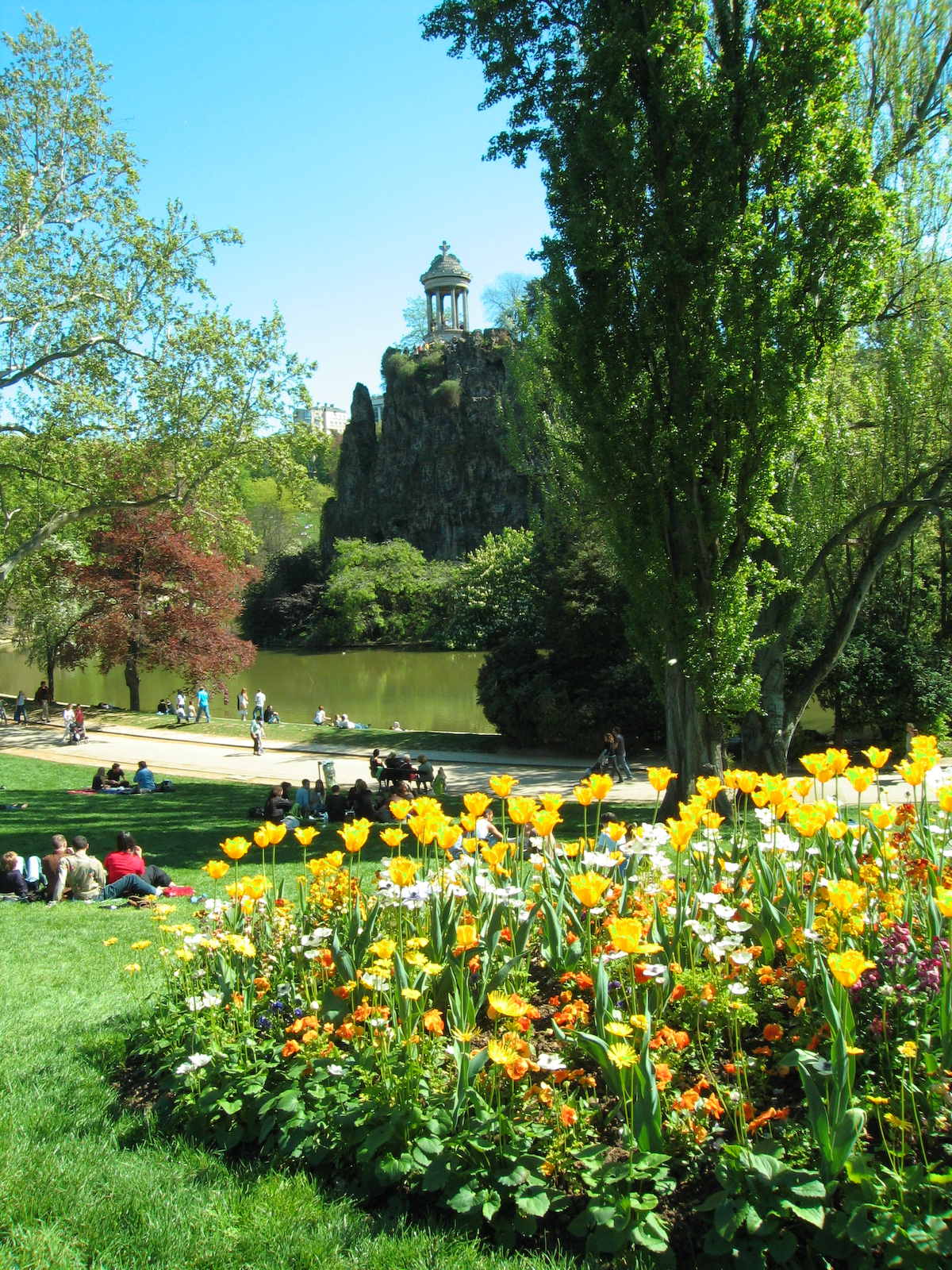
Haussmann built the Parc des Buttes Chaumont on the site of a former limestone quarry at the northern edge of the city.

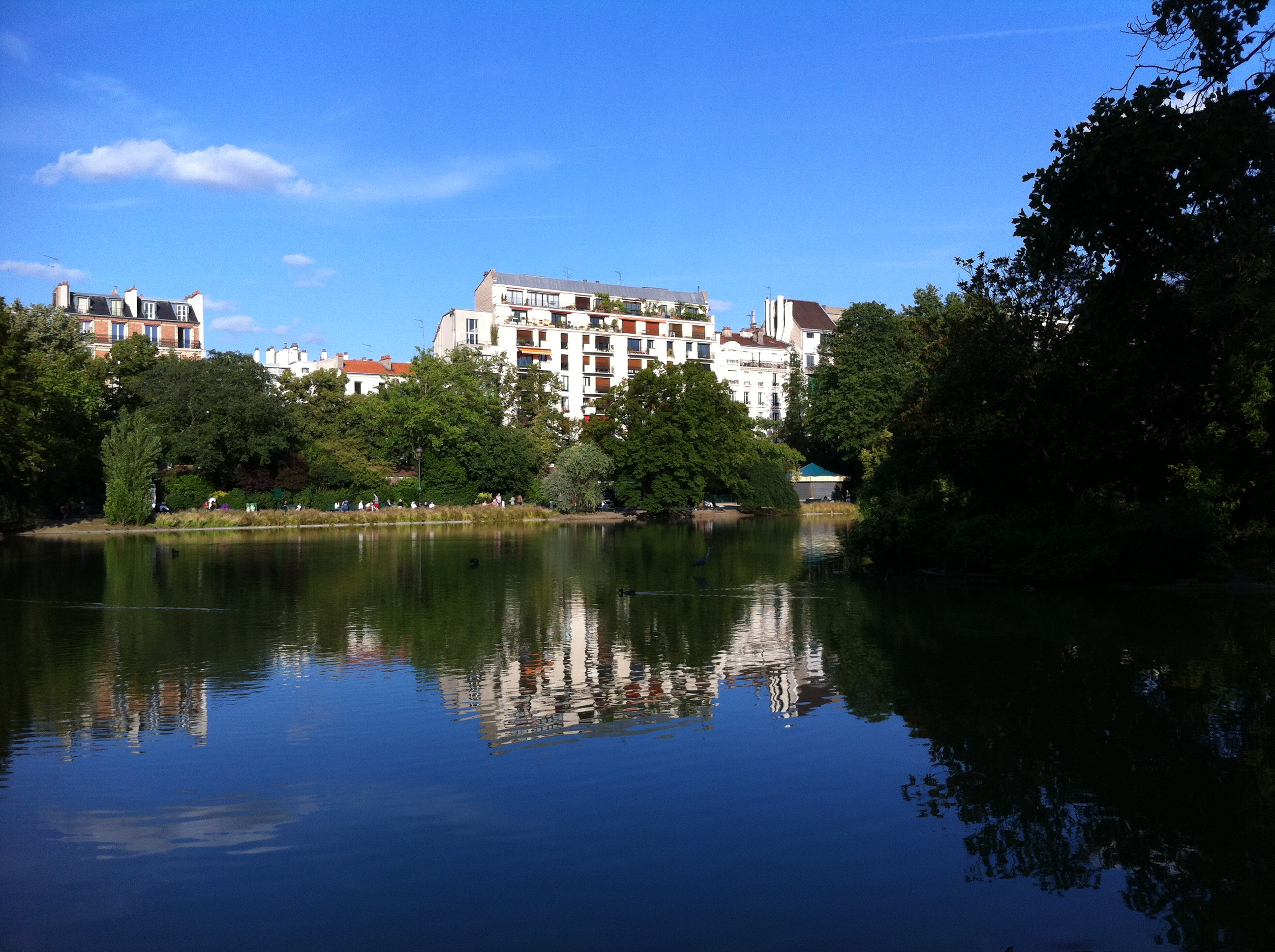
Parc Montsouris (1865–1869) was built at the southern edge of the city, where some of the old catacombs of Paris had been.

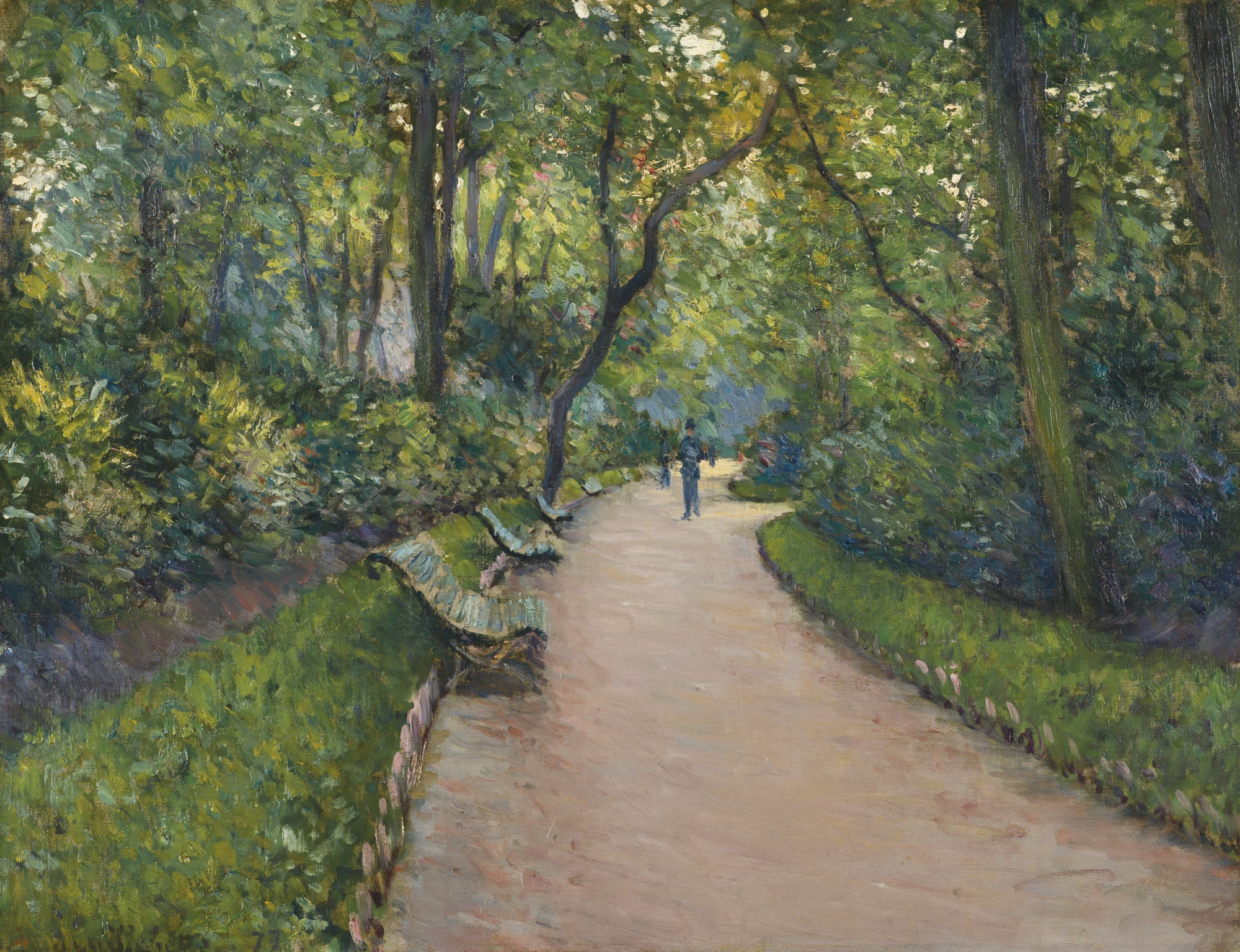
Parc Monceau, formerly the property of the family of King Louis-Philippe, was redesigned and replanted by Haussmann. A corner of the park was taken for a new residential quarter (painting by Gustave Caillebotte).

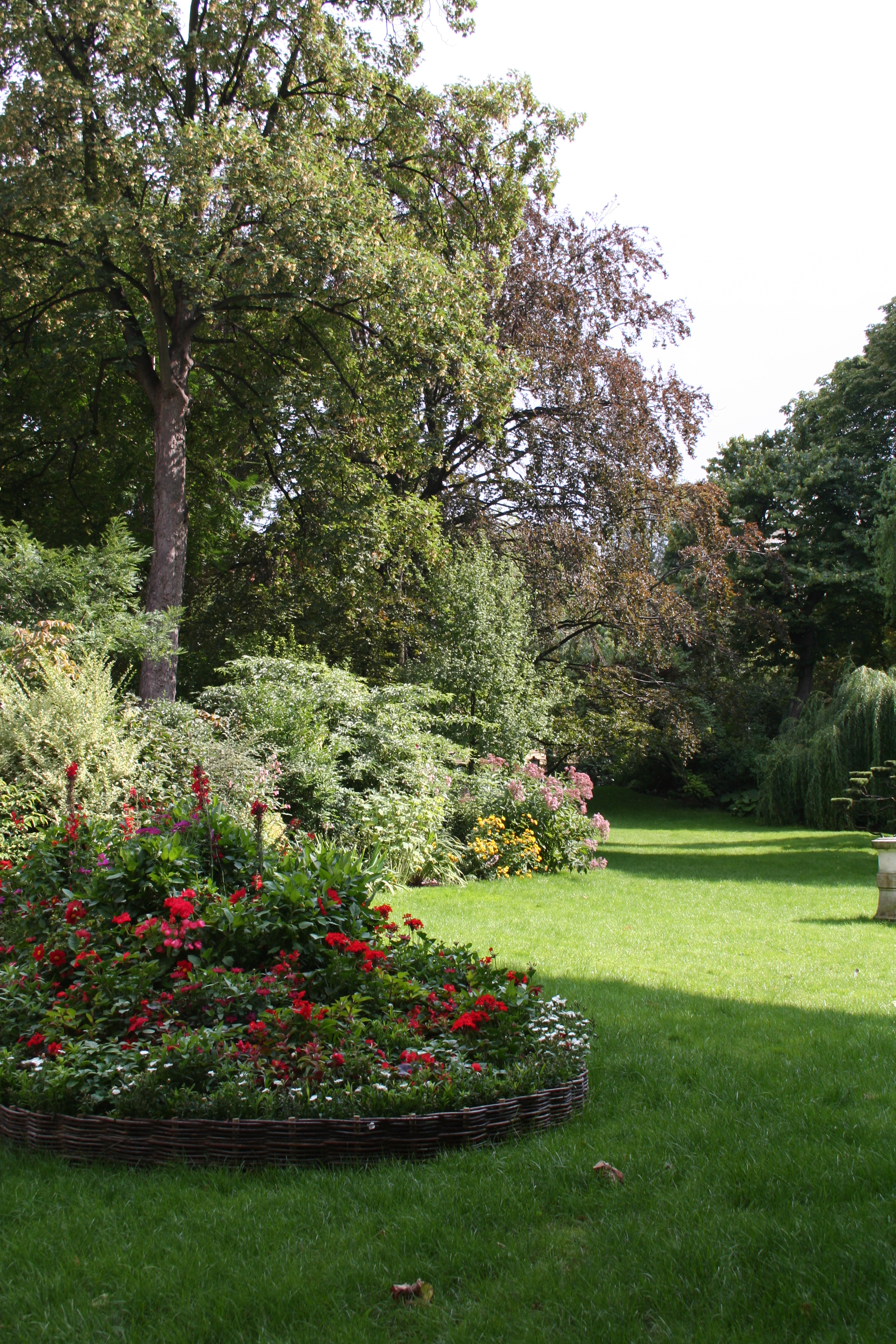
The Square des Batignolles, one of the new squares that Haussmann built in the neighbourhoods annexed to Paris in 1860

=== The architecture of Haussmann's Paris ===
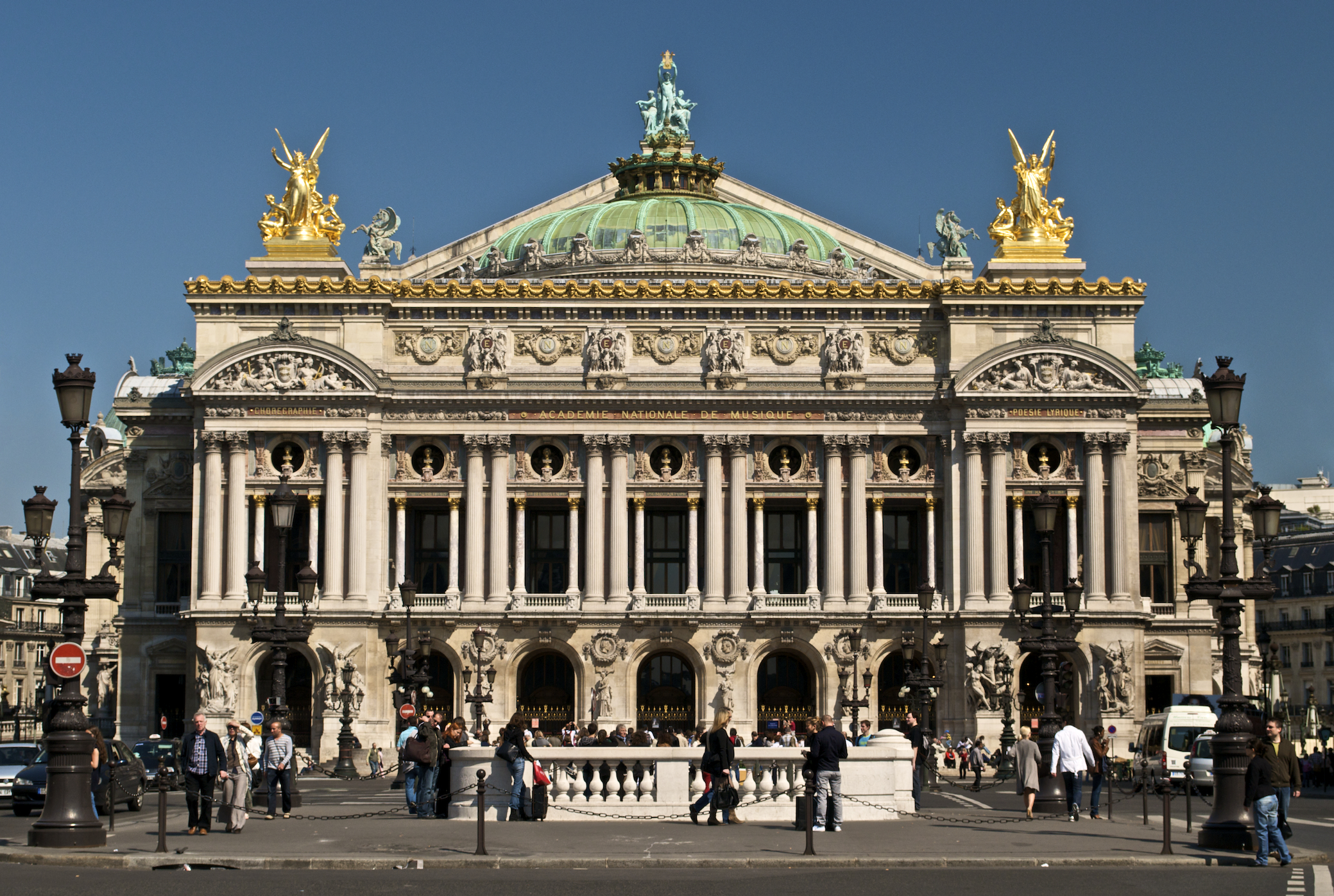
The Palais Garnier or Paris Opera (1875), then the largest theatre in the world, begun by Napoleon III but not finished until 1875. The style was described by its architect, Charles Garnier, simply as "Napoleon III".

Napoleon III and Haussmann commissioned a wide variety of architecture, some of it traditional, some of it very innovative, like the glass and iron pavilions of Les Halles; and some of it, such as the Opéra Garnier, commissioned by Napoleon III, designed by Charles Garnier but not finished until 1875, is difficult to classify, coming to be known as Second Empire style. Many of the buildings were designed by the city architect, Gabriel Davioud, who designed everything from city halls and theatres to park benches and kiosks.

His architectural projects included:

- The construction of two new railroad stations, the Gare du Nord and the Gare de l'Est; and the rebuilding of the Gare de Lyon.
- Six new mairies, or town halls, for the 1st, 2nd, 3rd, 4th, 7th and 12th arrondissements, and the enlargement of the other mairies.
- The reconstruction of Les Halles, the central market, replacing the old market buildings with large glass and iron pavilions, designed by Victor Baltard. In addition, Haussmann built a new market in the neighbourhood of the Temple, the Marché Saint-Honoré; the Marché de l'Europe in the 8th arrondissement; the Marché Saint-Quentin in the 10th arrondissement; the Marché de Belleville in the 20th; the Marché des Batignolles in the 17th; the Marché Saint-Didier and Marché d'Auteuil in the 16th; the Marché de Necker in the 15th; the Marché de Montrouge in the 14th; the Marché de Place d'Italie in the 13th; the Marché Saint-Maur-Popincourt in the 11th.
- The Paris Opera (now Palais Garnier), begun under Napoleon III and finished in 1875; and five new theatres; the Châtelet and Théâtre Lyrique on the Place du Châtelet; the Gaîté, Vaudeville and Panorama.
- Five lycées were renovated, and in each of the eighty neighbourhoods Haussmann established one municipal school for boys and one for girls, in addition to the large network of schools run by the Catholic church.
- The reconstruction and enlargement of the city's oldest hospital, the Hôtel-Dieu de Paris on the Île de la Cité.
- The completion of the last wing of the Louvre, and the opening up of the Place du Carrousel and the Place du Palais-Royal by the demolition of several old streets.
- The building of the first railroad bridge across the Seine; originally called the Pont Napoléon-III, now called simply the Pont National.

Since 1801, under Napoleon I, the French government was responsible for the building and maintenance of churches. Haussmann built, renovated or purchased nineteen churches. New churches included the Saint-Augustin, the Eglise Saint-Vincent de Paul, the Eglise de la Trinité. He bought six churches which had been purchased by private individuals during the French Revolution. Haussmann built or renovated five temples and built two new synagogues, on rue des Tournelles and rue de la Victoire.

Besides building churches, theatres and other public buildings, Haussmann paid attention to the details of the architecture along the street; his city architect, Gabriel Davioud, designed garden fences, kiosks, shelters for visitors to the parks, public toilets, and dozens of other small but important structures.

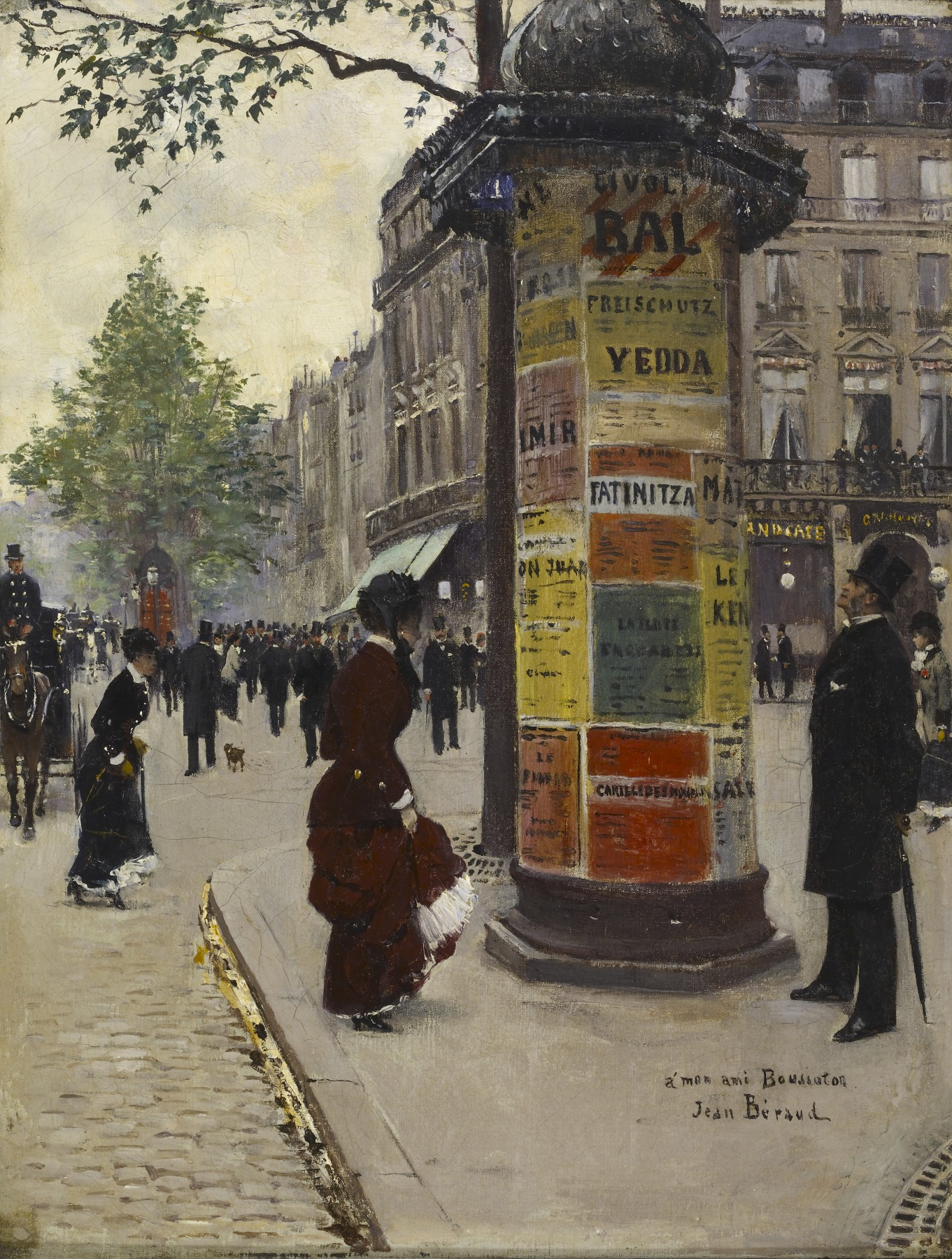
The hexagonal Parisian street advertising column (French: Colonne Morris), introduced by Haussmann

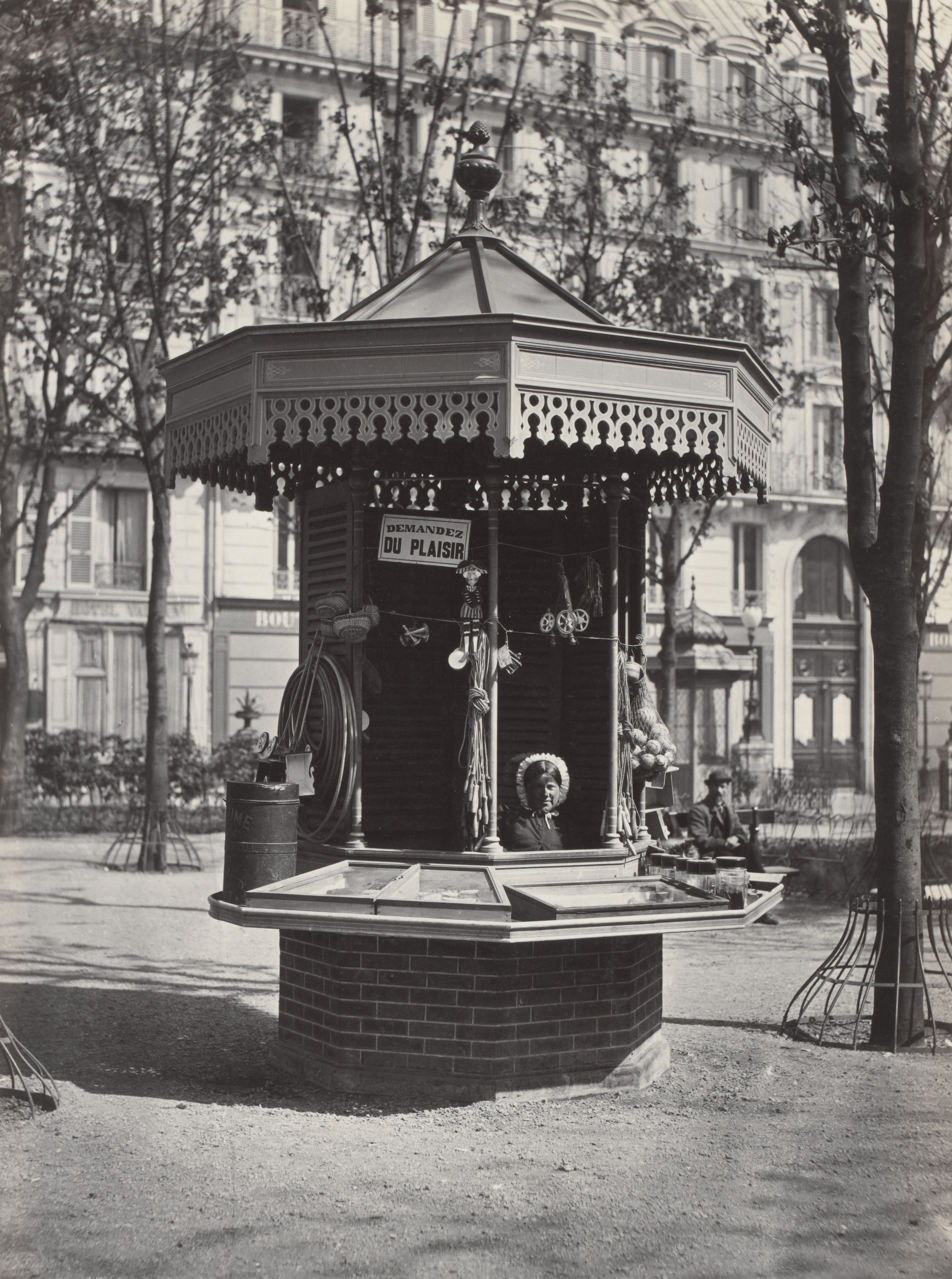
A kiosk for a street merchant on Square des Arts et Metiers (1865)

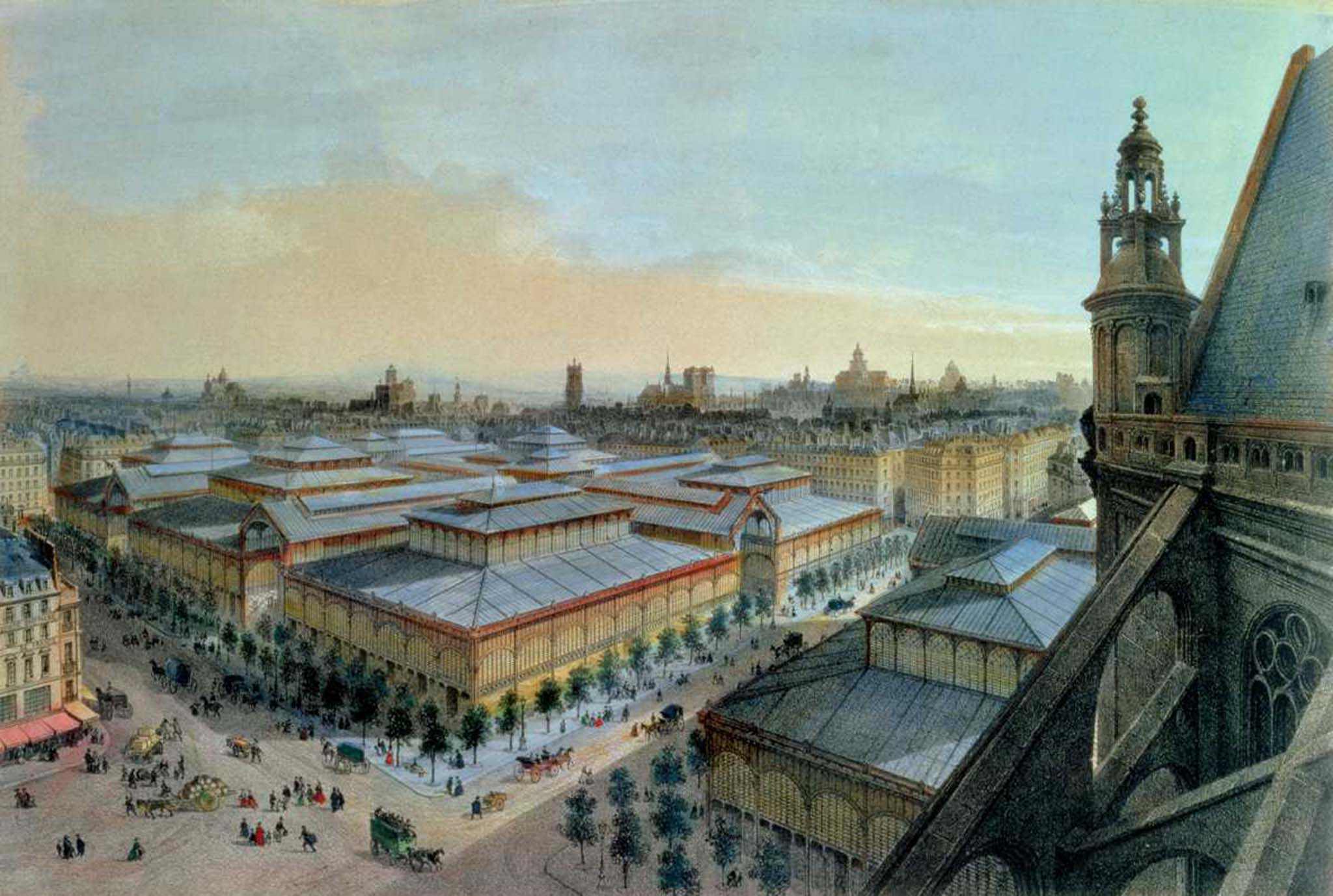
The pavilions of Les Halles, the great iron and glass central market designed by Victor Baltard (1870). The market was demolished in the 1970s, but one original hall was moved to Nogent-sur-Marne, where it can be seen today.

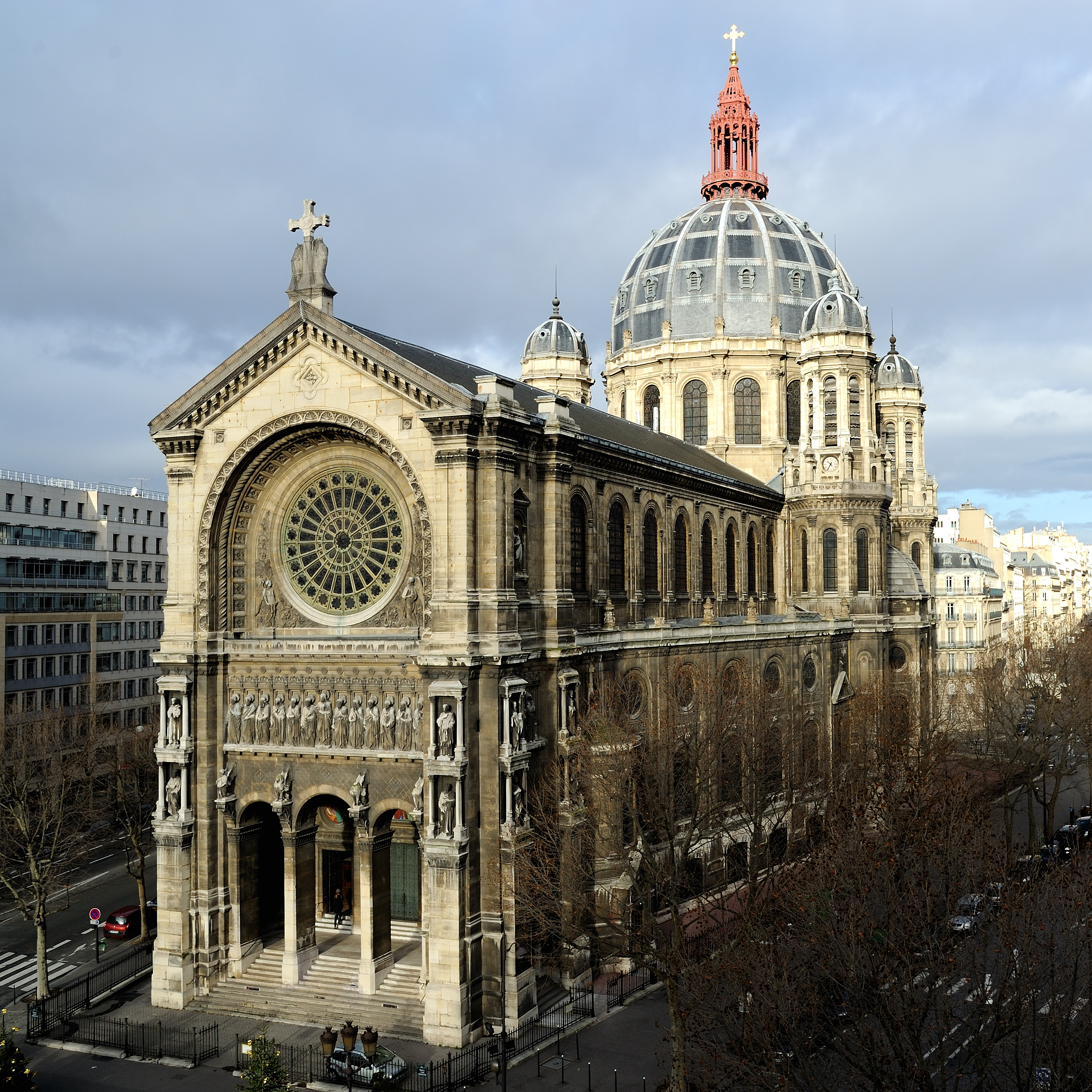
The Church of Saint Augustin (1860–1871), built by the same architect as the markets of Les Halles, Victor Baltard, looked traditional on the outside but had a revolutionary iron frame on the inside.

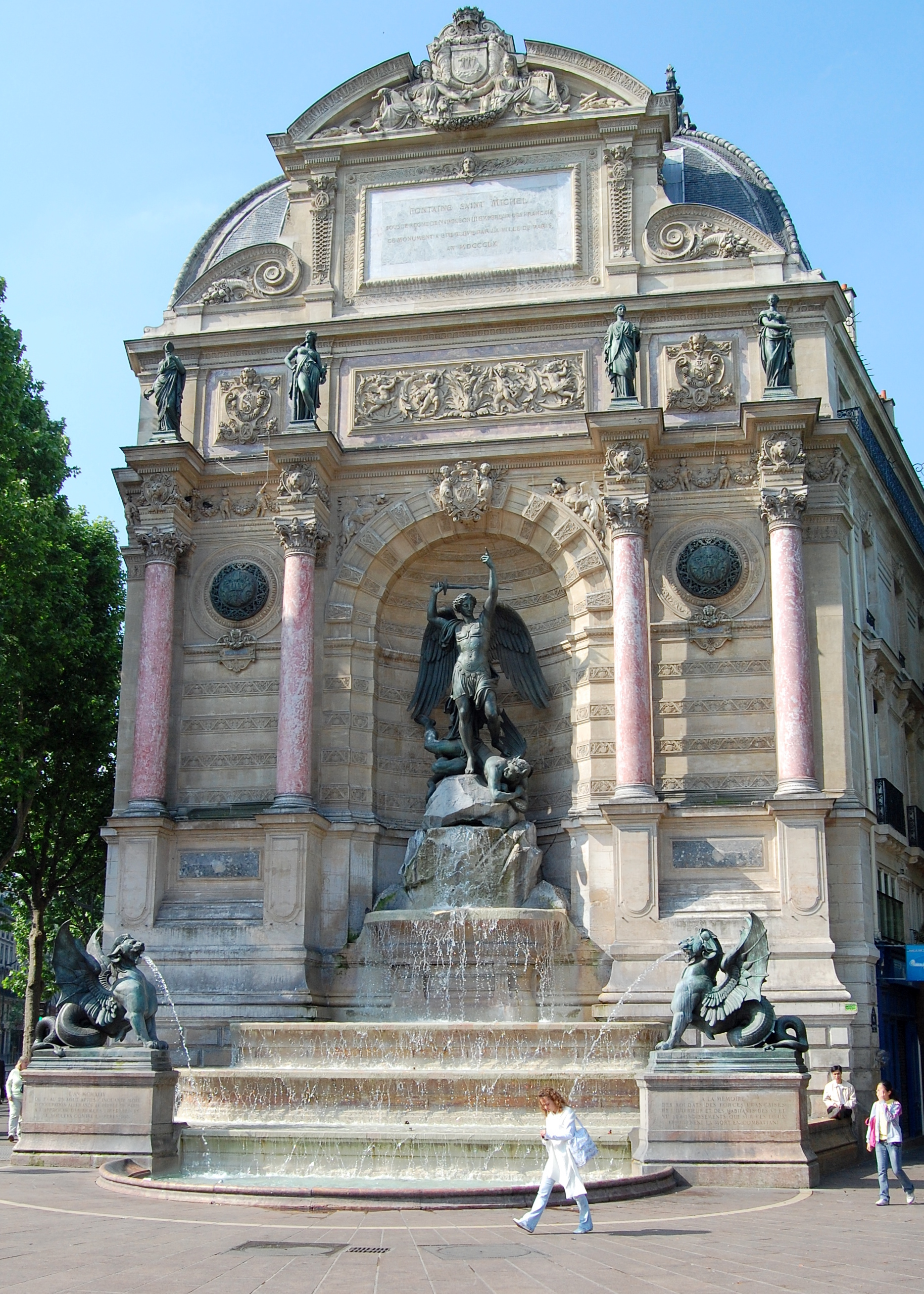
The Fontaine Saint-Michel (1858–1860), designed by Gabriel Davioud, marked the beginning of Boulevard Saint-Michel.

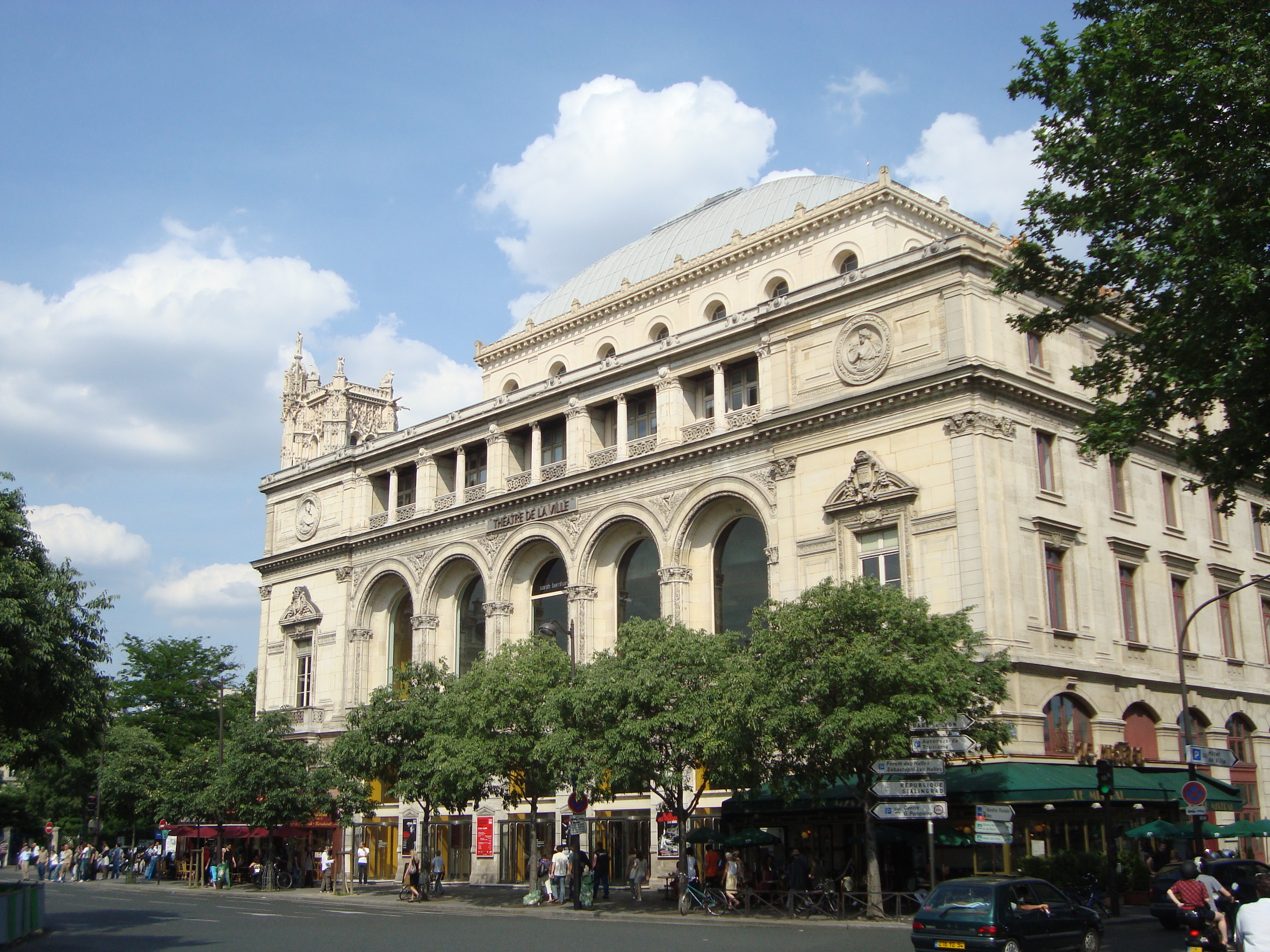
The Théâtre de la Ville, one of two matching theatres, designed by Gabriel Davioud, which Haussmann had constructed at the Place du Châtelet, the meeting point of his north–south and east–west boulevards

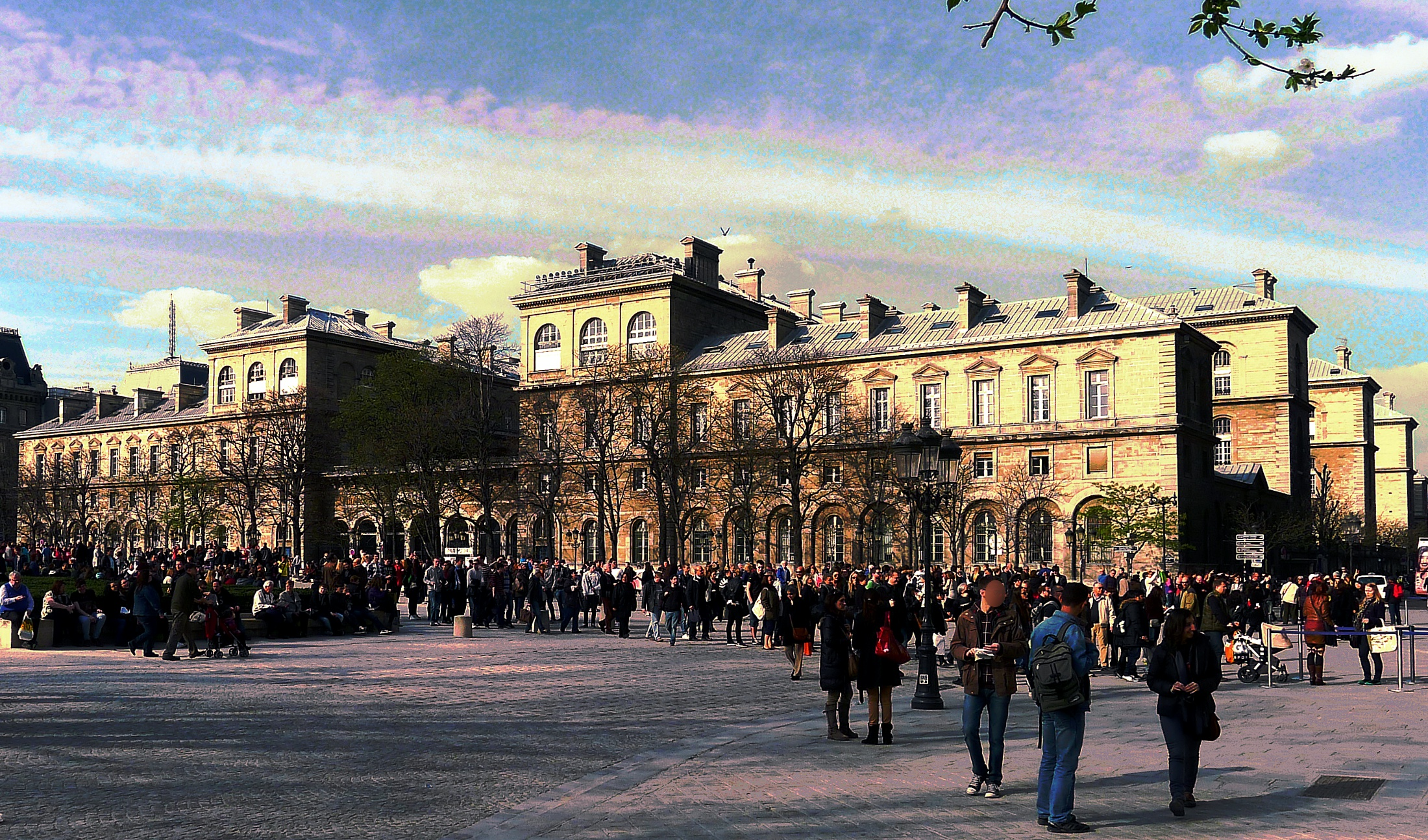
The Hotel-Dieu de Paris, the oldest hospital in Paris, next to the Cathedral of Notre Dame on the Île de la Cité, was enlarged and rebuilt by Haussmann beginning in 1864, and finished in 1876. It replaced several of the narrow, winding streets of the old medieval city.

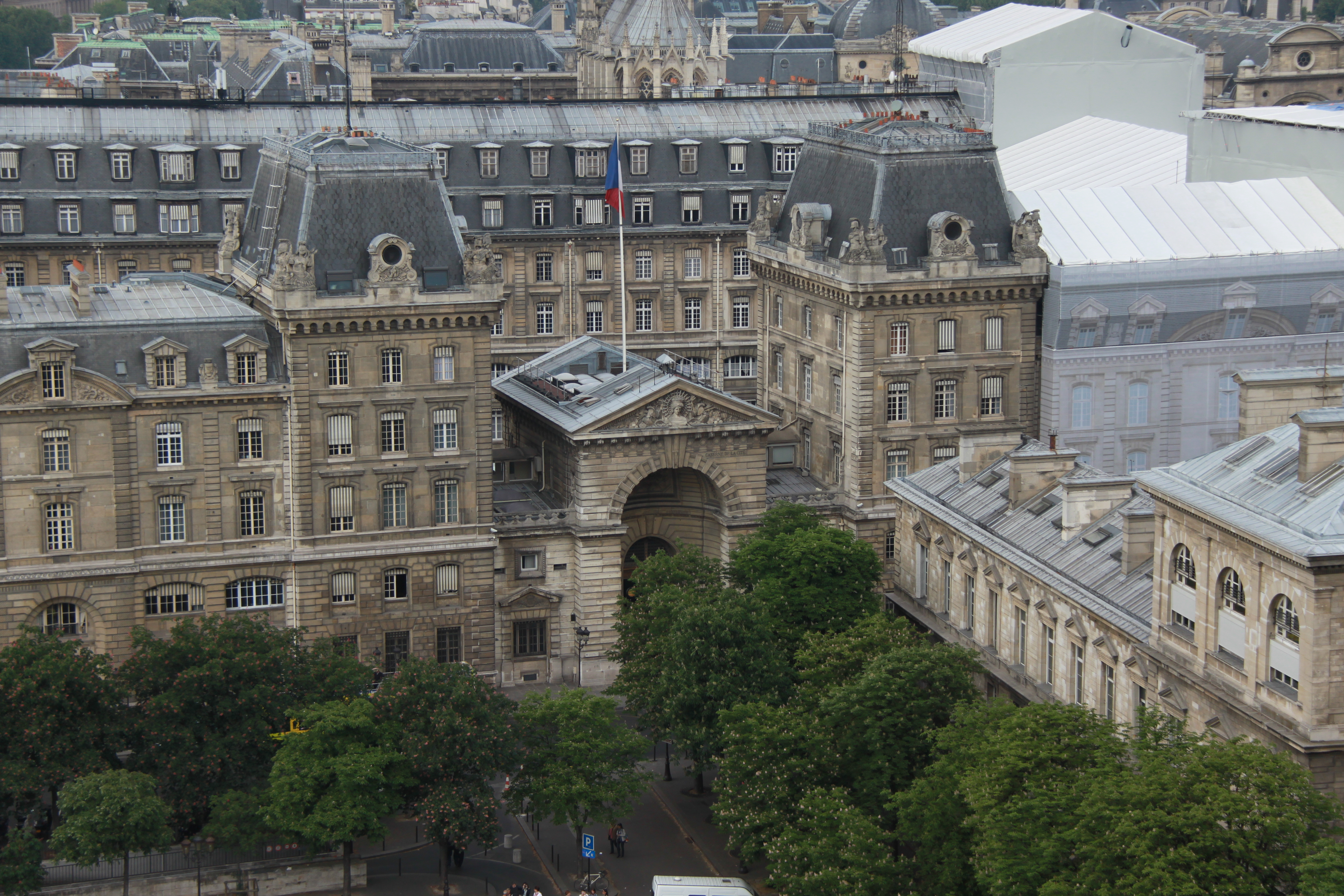
The Préfecture de Police (shown here), the new Palais de Justice and the Tribunal de Commerce took the place of a dense web of medieval streets on the western part of the Île de la Cité.

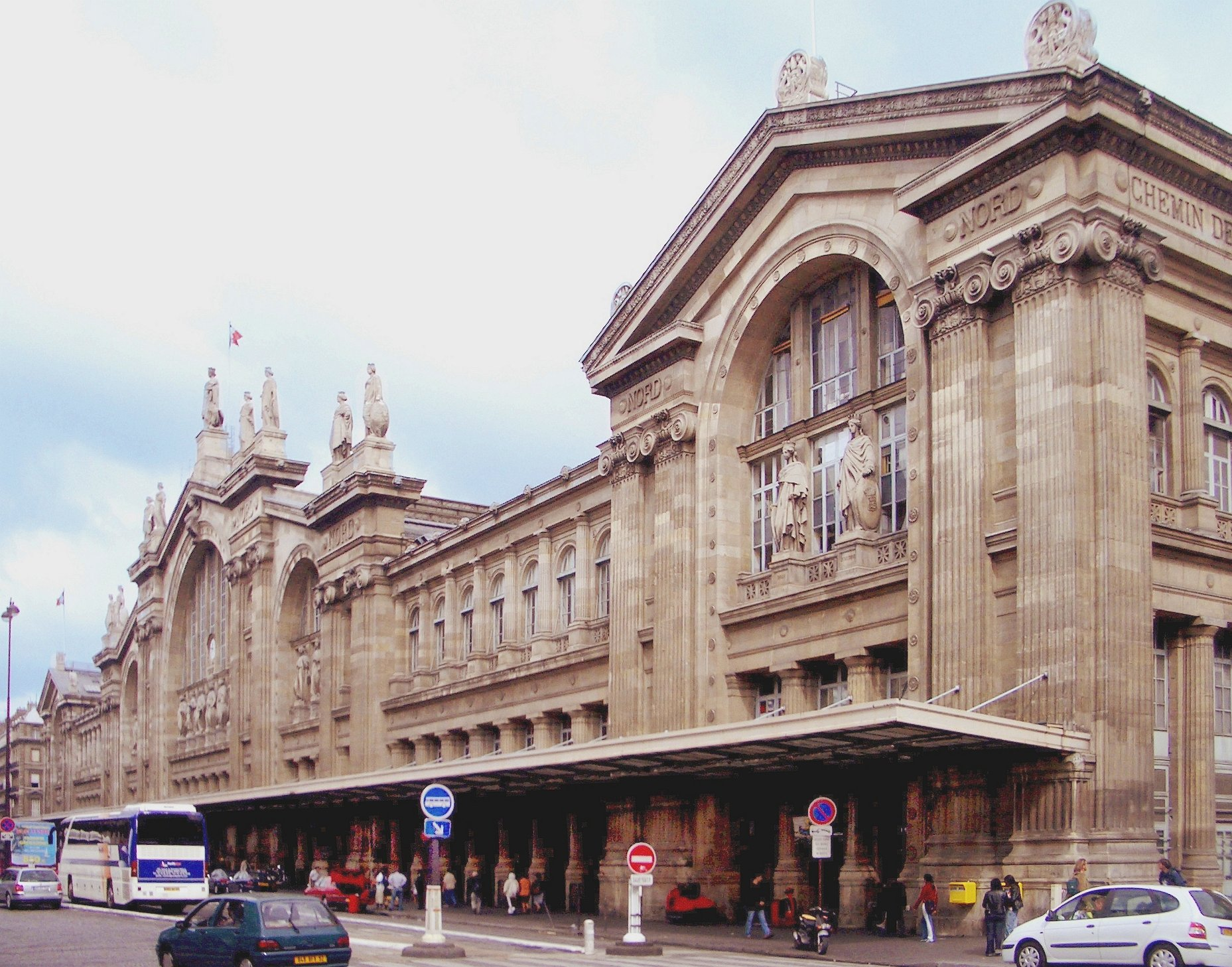
The Gare du Nord railway station (1861–64). Napoleon III and Haussmann saw the railway stations as the new gates of Paris, and built monumental new stations.

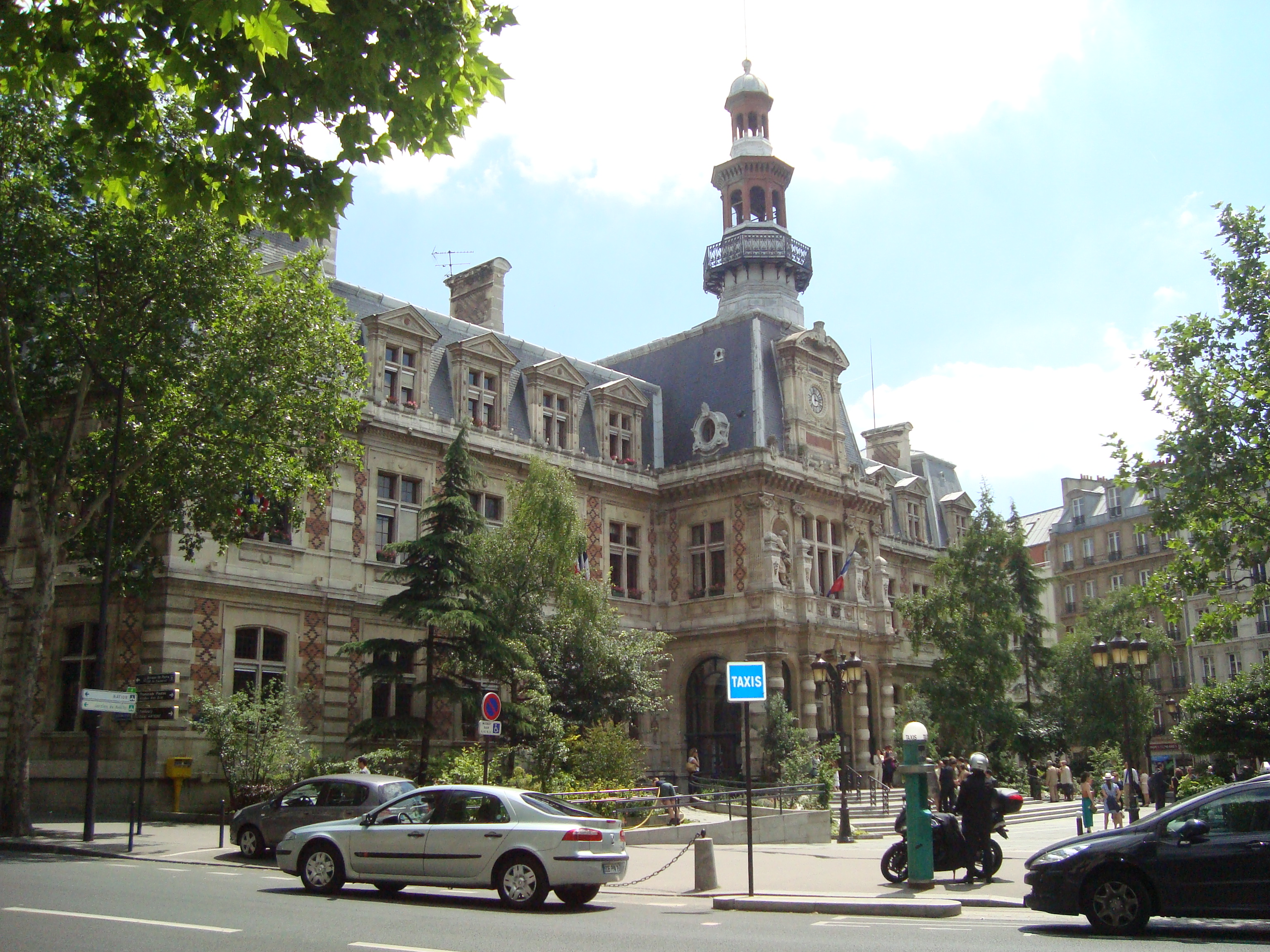
The new mairie, or town hall, of the 12th arrondissement. Haussmann built new city halls for six of the original twelve arrondissements, and enlarged the other six.

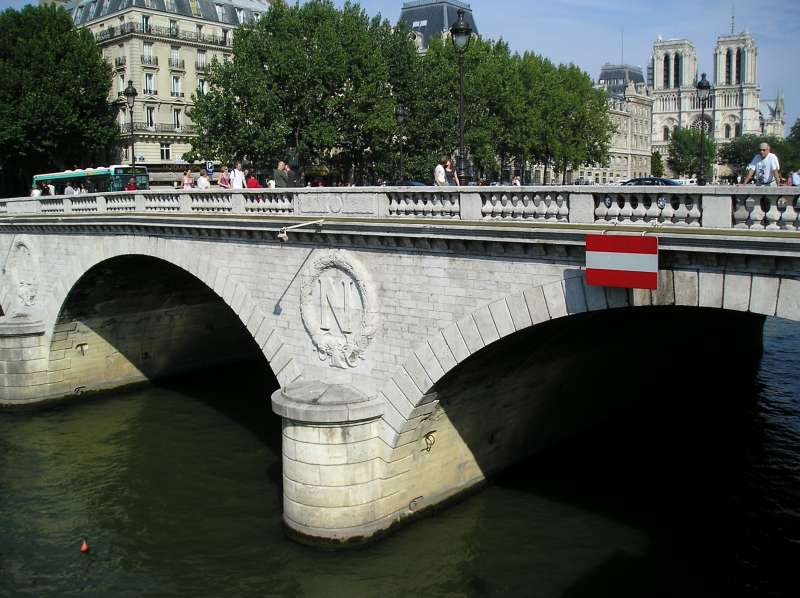
Haussmann reconstructed the Pont Saint-Michel connecting the Île de la Cité to the left bank. It still bears the initial N of Napoleon III.

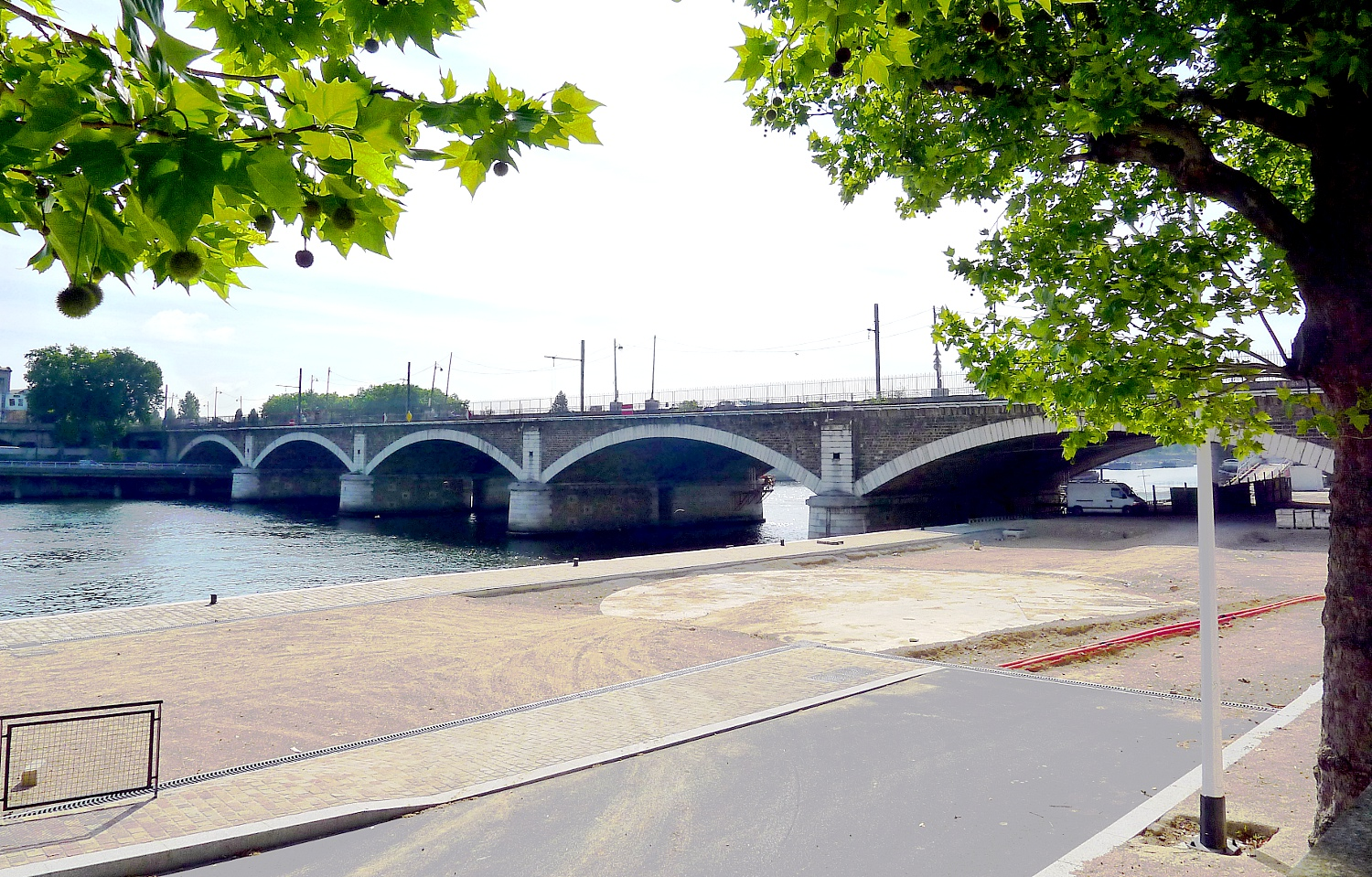
The first railroad bridge across the Seine (1852–53), originally called the Pont Napoléon-III, now called simply the Pont National

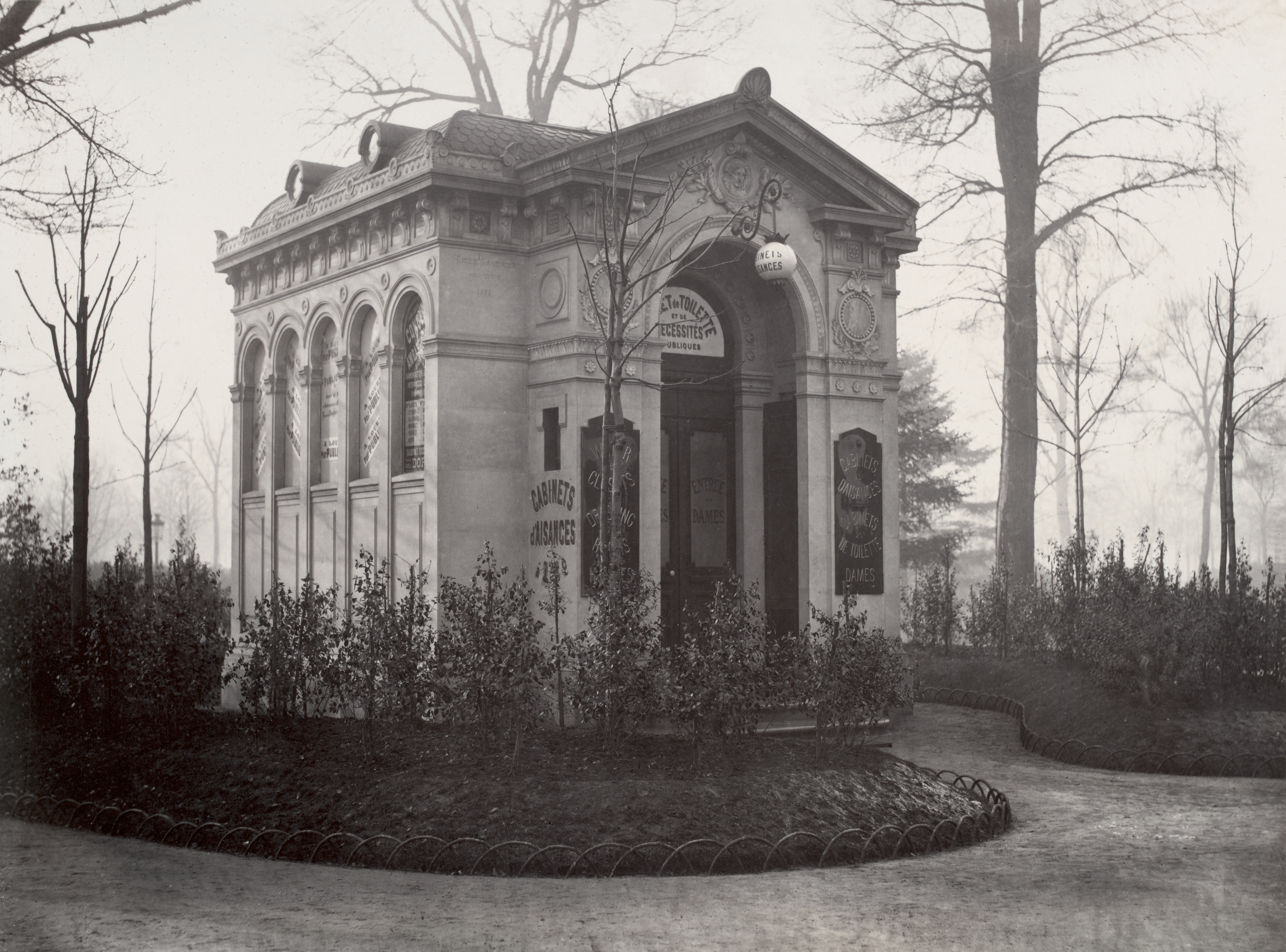
A chalet de nécessité, or public toilet, with a façade sculpted by Émile Gaudrier, built near the Champs-Élysées (1865)

=== The Haussmann building ===
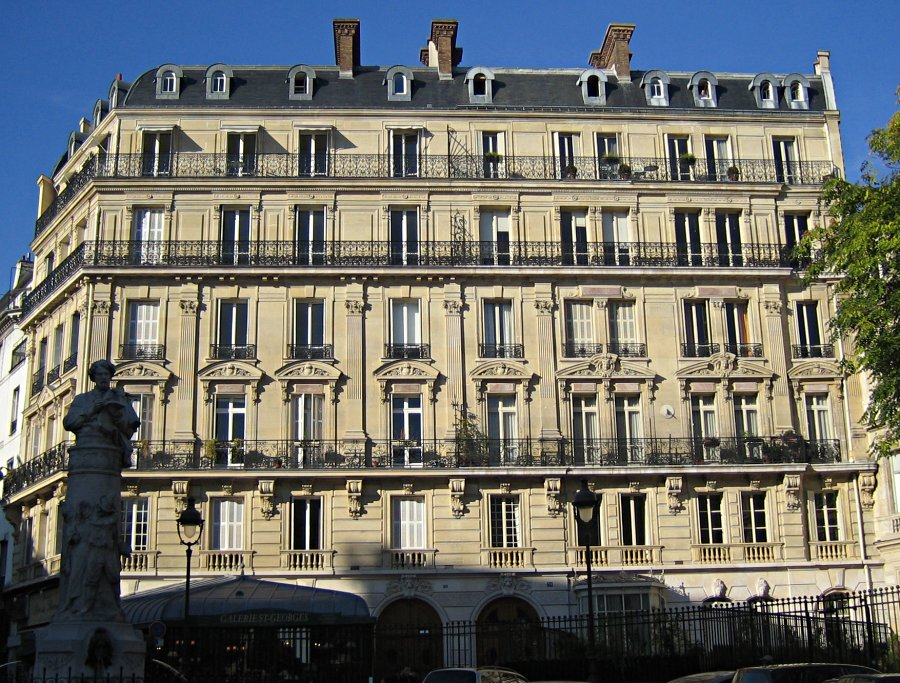
Place Saint-Georges

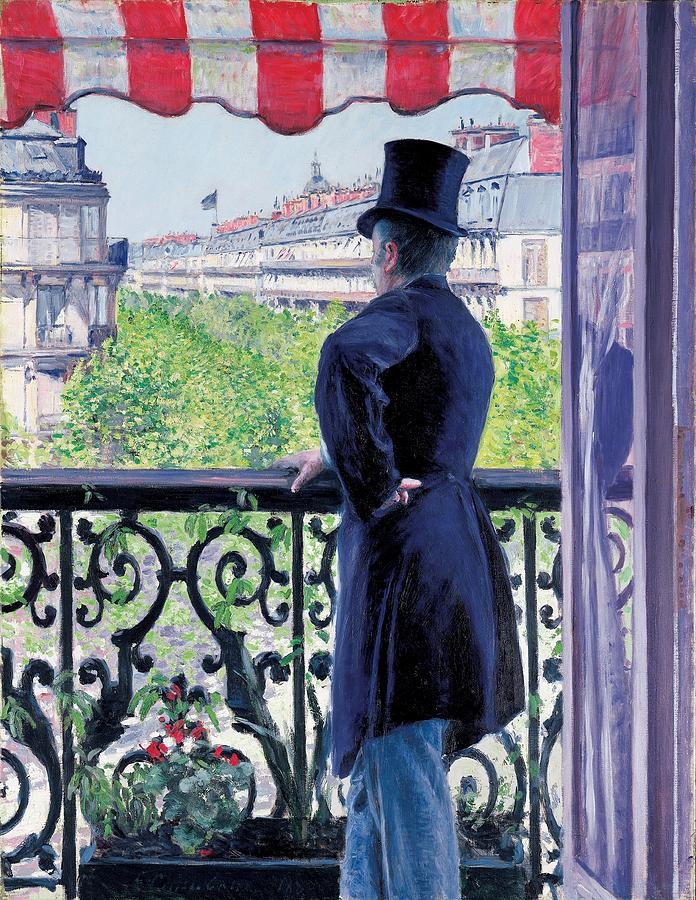
The Man at the Balcony, Boulevard Haussmann. Caillebotte, 1880

The most famous and recognisable feature of Haussmann's renovation of Paris are the Haussmann apartment buildings which line the boulevards of Paris. Street blocks were designed as homogeneous architectural wholes. He treated buildings not as independent structures, but as pieces of a unified urban landscape.

In 18th-century Paris, buildings were usually narrow (often only six metres wide [20 feet]); deep (sometimes forty metres; 130 feet) and tall—as many as five or six stories. The ground floor usually contained a shop, and the shopkeeper lived in the rooms above the shop. The upper floors were occupied by families; the top floor, under the roof, was originally a storage place, but under the pressure of the growing population, was usually turned into a low-cost residence. In the early 19th century, before Haussmann, the height of buildings was strictly limited to 22.41 meters (73 feet 6 inches), or four floors above the ground floor. The city also began to see a demographic shift; wealthier families began moving to the western neighbourhoods, partly because there was more space, and partly because the prevailing winds carried the smoke from the new factories in Paris toward the east.

In Haussmann's Paris, the streets became much wider, growing from an average of twelve meters (39 ft) wide to twenty-four meters (79 ft), and in the new arrondissements, often to eighteen meters (59 ft) wide.

The interiors of the buildings were left to the owners of the buildings, but the façades were strictly regulated, to ensure that they were the same height, color, material, and general design, and were harmonious when all seen together.

The reconstruction of the Rue de Rivoli was the model for the rest of the Paris boulevards. The new apartment buildings followed the same general plan:

- ground floor and basement with thick, load-bearing walls, fronts usually parallel to the street. This was often occupied by shops or offices.
- mezzanine or entresol intermediate level, with low ceilings; often also used by shops or offices.
- second, piano nobile floor with a balcony. This floor, in the days before elevators were common, was the most desirable floor, and had the largest and best apartments.
- third and fourth floors in the same style but with less elaborate stonework around the windows, sometimes lacking balconies.
- fifth floor with a single, continuous, undecorated balcony.
- mansard roof, angled at 45°, with garret rooms and dormer windows. Originally this floor was to be occupied by lower-income tenants, but with time and with higher rents it came to be occupied almost exclusively by the concierges and servants of the people in the apartments below.

The Haussmann façade was organised around horizontal lines that often continued from one building to the next: balconies and cornices were perfectly aligned without any noticeable alcoves or projections. The Rue de Rivoli served as a model for the entire network of new Parisian boulevards. Although Haussmann enforced strict rules for design and construction, he also allowed some variation to account for neighbourhoods and for the budgets of building developers. As a result, the apartment buildings fall into three broad categories, from the most to the least luxurious:

- First class buildings generally count four floors above ground level and the apartments had high ceilings. A servants' stairway leads to the fifth floor maids' rooms and service areas, while the richly decorated main staircases leads to the spacious apartments of the affluent residents. At the time, the courtyards had stables for horses and storage areas. The exterior of these buildings is often elaborately decorated, especially in the later post-Haussmann period when buildings were still being built in the Haussmann style.
- Second class buildings generally have five floors as well as a servants' stairway leading to the sixth floor where the servants' rooms are located. The exterior decoration of these buildings tends to be simple.
- Third class buildings usually have five floors and no servants' stairway. The facades often had no balconies and no exterior decoration.

For the building façades, the technological progress of stone sawing and (steam) transportation allowed the use of massive stone blocks instead of simple stone facing. The street-side result was a "monumental" effect that exempted buildings from a dependence on decoration; sculpture and other elaborate stonework would not become widespread until the end of the century. Before Haussmann, most buildings in Paris were made of brick or wood and covered with plaster. Haussmann required that the buildings along the new boulevards be either built or faced with cut stone, usually the local cream-colored Lutetian limestone, which gave more harmony to the appearance of the boulevards. He also required, using a decree from 1852, that the façades of all buildings be regularly maintained, repainted, or cleaned, at least every ten years. under the threat of a fine of one hundred francs.

=== Underneath the streets of Haussmann's Paris – the renovation of the city's infrastructure ===
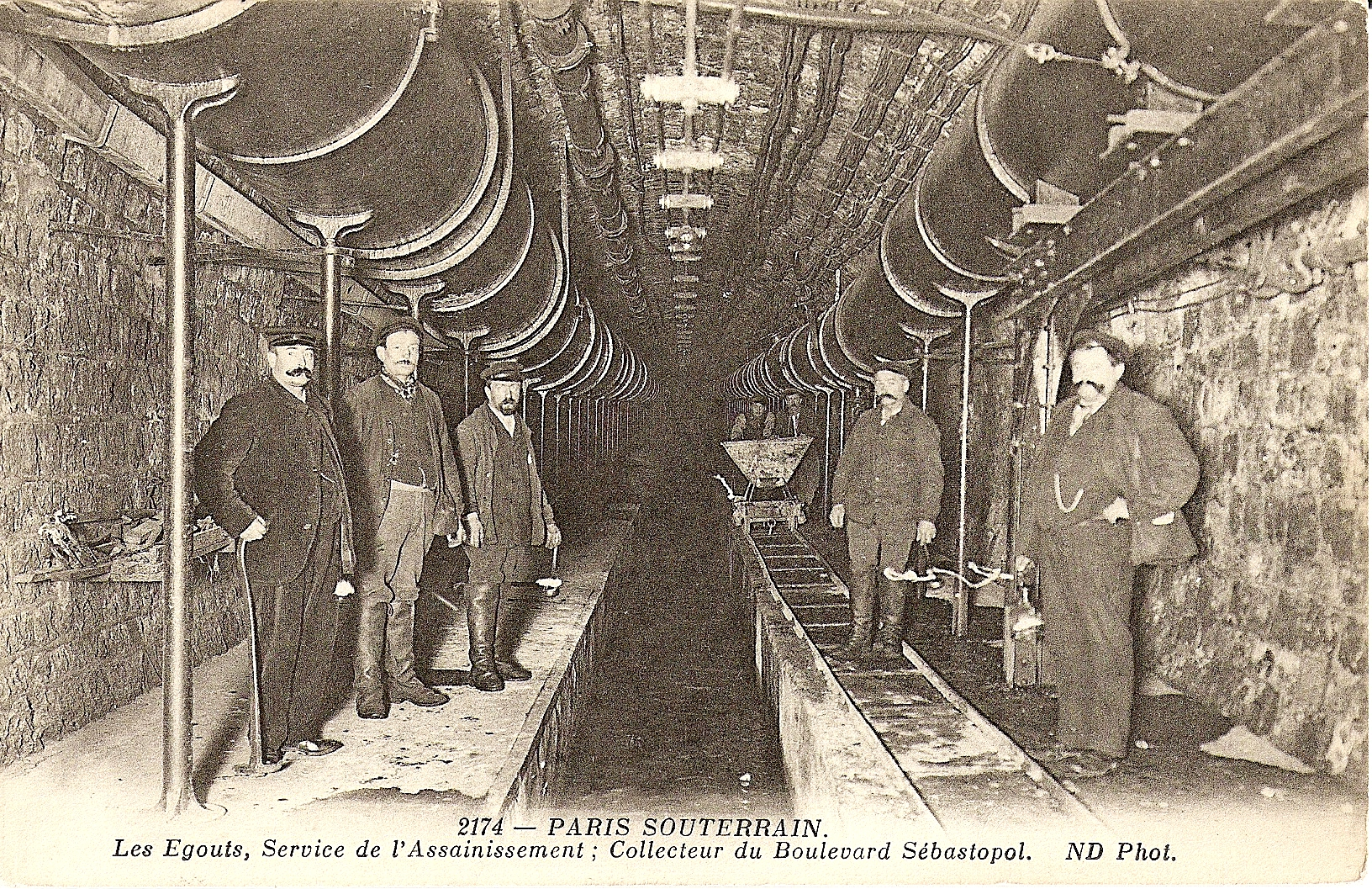
The new water pipes and sewers built under Boulevard Sébastopol

While he was rebuilding the boulevards of Paris, Haussmann simultaneously rebuilt the dense labyrinth of pipes, sewers and tunnels under the streets which provided Parisians with basic services. Haussmann wrote in his memoirs: "The underground galleries are an organ of the great city, functioning like an organ of the human body, without seeing the light of day; clean and fresh water, light and heat circulate like the various fluids whose movement and maintenance serves the life of the body; the secretions are taken away mysteriously and don't disturb the good functioning of the city and without spoiling its beautiful exterior."

Haussmann began with the water supply. Before Haussmann, drinking water in Paris was either lifted by steam engines from the Seine, or brought by a canal, started by Napoleon I, from the River Ourcq, a tributary of the River Marne. The quantity of water was insufficient for the fast-growing city, and, since the sewers also emptied into the Seine near the intakes for drinking water, it was also notoriously unhealthy. In March 1855 Haussmann appointed Eugène Belgrand, a graduate of the École polytechnique, to the post of Director of Water and Sewers of Paris.

Belgrand first addressed the city's fresh water needs, constructing a system of aqueducts that nearly doubled the amount of water available per person per day and quadrupled the number of homes with running water. These aqueducts discharged their water in reservoirs situated within the city. Inside the city limits and opposite Parc Montsouris, Belgrand built the largest water reservoir in the world, Montsouris Reservoir, to hold the water from the River Vanne.

At the same time Belgrand began rebuilding the water distribution and sewer system under the streets. In 1852 Paris had 142 kilometres (88 mi) of sewers, which could carry only liquid waste. Containers of solid waste were picked up each night by people called vidangeurs, who carried it to waste dumps on the outskirts of the city. The tunnels he designed were intended to be clean, easily accessible, and substantially larger than the previous Parisian underground. Under his guidance, Paris's sewer system expanded fourfold between 1852 and 1869.

Haussmann and Belgrand built new sewer tunnels under each sidewalk of the new boulevards. The sewers were designed to be large enough to evacuate rain water immediately; the large amount of water used to wash the city streets; waste water from both industries and individual households; and water that collected in basements when the level of the Seine was high. Before Haussmann, the sewer tunnels (featured in Victor Hugo's Les Miserables) were cramped and narrow, just 1.8 m (5 ft 11 in) high and 75 to 80 centimeters (2 feet 7 inches) wide. The new tunnels were 2.3 meters (7 feet 7 inches) high and 1.3 meters (4 feet 3 inches) wide, large enough for men to work standing up. These flowed into larger tunnels that carried the waste water to even larger collector tunnels, which were 4.4 m (14 ft) high and 5.6 m (18 ft) wide. A channel down the centre of the tunnel carried away the waste water, with sidewalks on either side for the égoutiers, or sewer workers. Specially designed wagons and boats moved on rails up and down the channels, cleaning them. Belgrand proudly invited tourists to visit his sewers and ride in the boats under the streets of the city.

The underground labyrinth built by Haussmann also provided gas for heat and for lights to illuminate Paris. At the beginning of the Second Empire, gas was provided by six different private companies. Haussmann forced them to consolidate into a single company, the Compagnie parisienne d'éclairage et de chauffage par le gaz, with rights to provide gas to Parisians for 50 years. Consumption of gas tripled between 1855 and 1859. In 1850 there were only 9000 gaslights in Paris; by 1867, the Paris Opera and four other major theatres alone had fifteen thousand gas lights. Almost all the new residential buildings of Paris had gaslights in the courtyards and stairways; the monuments and public buildings of Paris, the arcades of the Rue de Rivoli, and the squares, boulevards and streets were illuminated at night by gaslights. For the first time, Paris was the City of Light.

== Critics of Haussmann's Paris ==
=== Contemporaneous ===
Haussmann's renovation of Paris had many critics during his own time. Some were simply tired of the continuous construction. The French historian Léon Halévy wrote in 1867, "the work of Monsieur Haussmann is incomparable. Everyone agrees. Paris is a marvel, and M. Haussmann has done in fifteen years what a century could not have done. But that's enough for the moment. There will be a 20th century. Let's leave something for them to do."

Others regretted that he had destroyed a historic part of the city. The brothers Goncourt condemned the avenues that cut at right angles through the centre of the old city, where "one could no longer feel in the world of Balzac." Jules Ferry, the most vocal critic of Haussmann in the French parliament, wrote: "We weep with our eyes full of tears for the old Paris, the Paris of Voltaire, of Desmoulins, the Paris of 1830 and 1848, when we see the grand and intolerable new buildings, the costly confusion, the triumphant vulgarity, the awful materialism, that we are going to pass on to our descendants."

=== Later era ===
A 20th-century historian of Paris, René Héron de Villefosse, shared: "in less than twenty years, Paris lost its ancestral appearance, its character which passed from generation to generation... the picturesque and charming ambiance which our fathers had passed onto us was demolished, often without good reason." Héron de Villefosse denounced Haussmann's central market, Les Halles, as "a hideous eruption" of cast iron. Describing Haussmann's renovation of the Île de la Cité, he wrote: "the old ship of Paris was torpedoed by Baron Haussmann and sunk during his reign. It was perhaps the greatest crime of the megalomaniac prefect and also his biggest mistake...His work caused more damage than a hundred bombings. It was in part necessary, and one should give him credit for his self-confidence, but he was certainly lacking culture and good taste...In the United States, it would be wonderful, but in our capital, which he covered with barriers, scaffolds, gravel, and dust for twenty years, he committed crimes, errors, and showed bad taste."

Paris historian Patrice de Moncan, in general an admirer of Haussmann's work, faulted Haussmann for not preserving more of the historic streets on the Île de la Cité, and for clearing a large open space in front of the Cathedral of Notre Dame, while hiding another major historical monument, Sainte-Chapelle, out of sight within the walls of the Palais de Justice. He also criticized Haussmann for reducing the Jardin du Luxembourg from thirty to twenty-six hectares in order to build the rues Medici, Guynemer and Auguste-Comte; for giving away a half of Parc Monceau to the Pereire brothers for building lots, in order to reduce costs; and for destroying several historic residences along the route of the Boulevard Saint-Germain, because of his unwavering determination to have straight streets.

=== The debate about the military purposes of Haussmann's boulevards ===
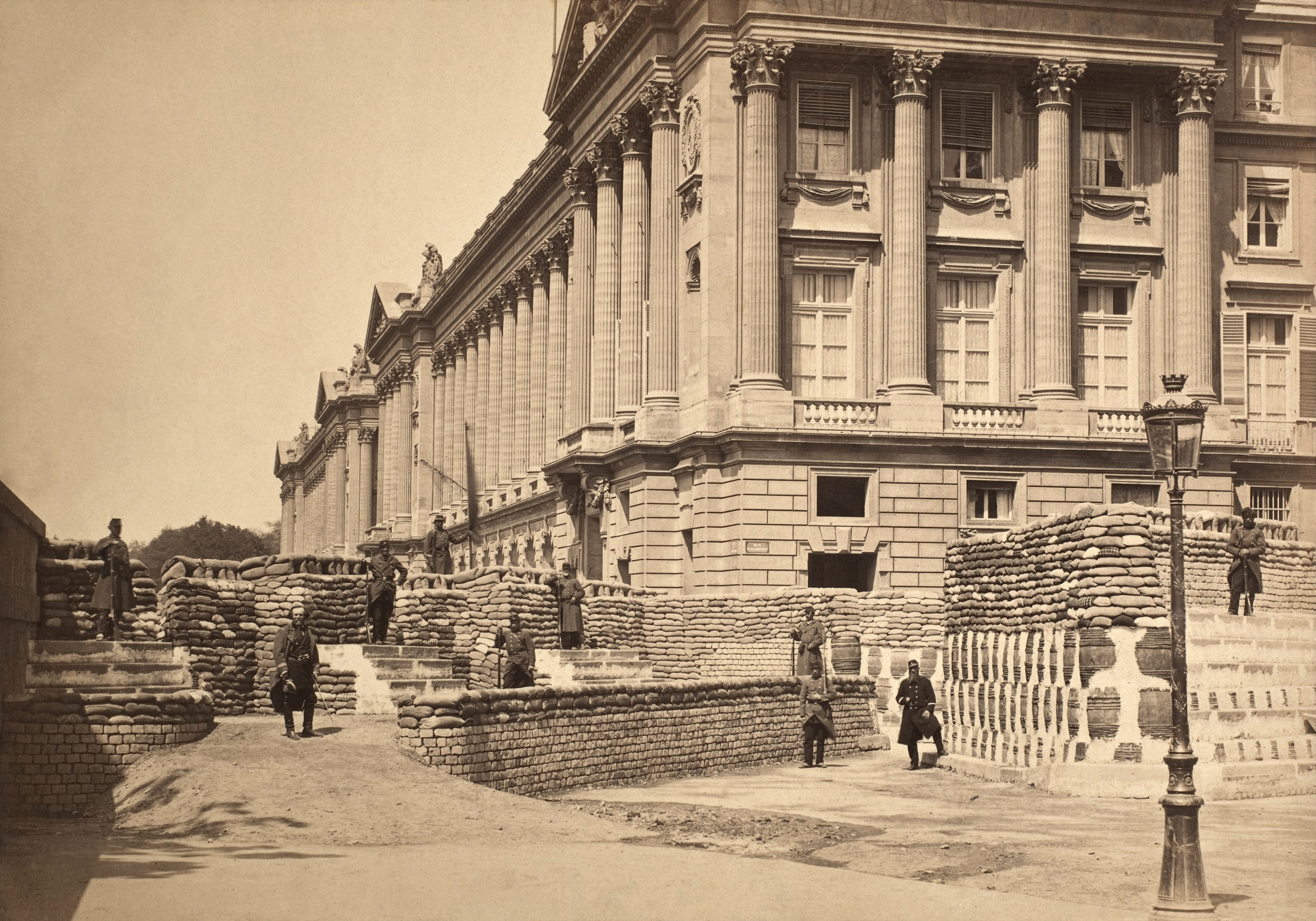
During the Paris Commune, the Communards built an impressive fort where the Rue de Rivoli met the Place de la Concorde. The army used side streets to move around it, and captured it from behind.

Some of Haussmann's critics said that the real purpose of Haussmann's boulevards was to make it easier for the army to manoeuver and suppress armed uprisings; Paris had experienced six such uprisings between 1830 and 1848, all in the narrow, crowded streets in the centre and east of Paris and on the left bank around the Panthéon. These critics argued that a small number of large, open intersections allowed easy control by a small force. In addition, buildings set back from the centre of the street could not be used so easily as fortifications. Émile Zola repeated that argument in his early novel, La Curée: "Paris sliced by strokes of a saber: the veins opened, nourishing one hundred thousand earth movers and stone masons; criss-crossed by admirable strategic routes, placing forts in the heart of the old neighborhoods."

Some real-estate owners demanded large, straight avenues to help troops manoeuvre. The argument that the boulevards were designed for troop movements was repeated by 20th century critics, including the French historian, René Hérron de Villefosse, who wrote, "the larger part of the piercing of avenues had for its reason the desire to avoid popular insurrections and barricades. They were strategic from their conception." This argument was also popularized by the American architectural critic, Lewis Mumford.

Haussmann himself did not deny the military value of the wider streets. In his memoirs, he wrote that his new Boulevard Sébastopol resulted in the "gutting of old Paris, of the quarter of riots and barricades". He admitted he sometimes used this argument with the Parliament to justify the high cost of his projects, arguing that they were for national defence and should be paid for, at least partially, by the state. He wrote: "But, as for me, I who was the promoter of these additions made to the original project, I declare that I never thought in the least, in adding them, of their greater or lesser strategic value." The Paris urban historian Patrice de Moncan wrote: "To see the works created by Haussmann and Napoleon III only from the perspective of their strategic value is very reductive. The Emperor was a convinced follower of Saint-Simon. His desire to make Paris, the economic capital of France, a more open, more healthy city, not only for the upper classes but also for the workers, cannot be denied, and should be recognised as the primary motivation."

There was only one armed uprising in Paris after Haussmann, the Paris Commune from March through May 1871, and the boulevards played no important role. The Communards seized power easily, because the French Army was absent, defeated and captured by the Prussians. The Communards took advantage of the boulevards to build a few large forts of paving stones with wide fields of fire at strategic points, such as the meeting point of the Rue de Rivoli and Place de la Concorde. But when the newly organised army arrived at the end of May, it avoided the main boulevards, advanced slowly and methodically to avoid casualties, worked its way around the barricades, and took them from behind. The Communards were defeated in one week not because of Haussmann's boulevards, but because they were outnumbered by five to one, they had fewer weapons and fewer people trained to use them, they had no hope of getting support from outside Paris, they had no plan for the defence of the city; they had very few experienced officers; there was no single commander; and each neighbourhood was left to defend itself.

As Paris historian Patrice de Moncan observed, most of Haussmann's projects had little or no strategic or military value; the purpose of building new sewers, aqueducts, parks, hospitals, schools, city halls, theatres, churches, markets and other public buildings was, as Haussmann stated, to employ thousands of workers, and to make the city more healthy, less congested, and more beautiful.

=== Social disruption ===
Haussmann was also blamed for the social disruption caused by his gigantic building projects. Thousands of families and businesses had to relocate when their buildings were demolished for the construction of the new boulevards. Haussmann was also blamed for the dramatic increase in rents, which increased by three hundred percent during the Second Empire, while wages, except for those of construction workers, remained flat, and blamed for the enormous amount of speculation in the real estate market. He was also blamed for reducing the amount of housing available for low income families, forcing low-income Parisians to move from the centre to the outer neighbourhoods of the city, where rents were lower. Statistics showed that the population of the first and sixth arrondissements, where some of the most densely populated neighbourhoods were located, dropped, while the population of the new 17th and 20th arrondissements, on the edges of the city, grew rapidly.

Arrondissement	1861	1866	1872
1st	89,519	81,665	74,286
6th	95,931	99,115	90,288
17th	75,288	93,193	101,804
20th	70,060	87,844	92,712

Haussmann's defenders noted that he built far more buildings than he tore down: he demolished 19,730 buildings, containing 120,000 lodgings or apartments, while building 34,000 new buildings, with 215,300 new apartments and lodgings. French historian Michel Cremona wrote that, even with the increase in population, from 949,000 Parisians in 1850 to 1,130,500 in 1856, to two million in 1870, including those in the newly annexed eight arrondissements around the city, the number of housing units grew faster than the population.

Recent studies have also shown that the proportion of Paris housing occupied by low-income Parisians did not decrease under Haussmann, and that the poor were not driven out of Paris by Haussmann's renovation. In 1865 a survey by the prefecture of Paris showed that 780,000 Parisians, or 42 percent of the population, did not pay taxes due to their low income. Another 330,000 Parisians or 17 percent, paid less than 250 francs a month rent. Thirty-two percent of the Paris housing was occupied by middle-class families, paying rent between 250 and 1500 francs. 50,000 Parisians were classified as rich, with rents over 1500 francs a month, and occupied just three percent of the residences.

Other critics blamed Haussmann for the division of Paris into rich and poor neighbourhoods, with the poor concentrated in the east and the middle class and wealthy in the west. Haussmann's defenders noted that this shift in population had been underway since the 1830s, long before Haussmann, as more prosperous Parisians moved to the western neighbourhoods, where there was more open space, and where residents benefited from the prevailing winds, which carried the smoke from Paris's new industries toward the east. His defenders also noted that Napoleon III and Haussmann made a special point to build an equal number of new boulevards, new sewers, water supplies, hospitals, schools, squares, parks and gardens in the working class eastern arrondissements as they did in the western neighbourhoods.

A form of vertical stratification did take place in the Paris population due to Haussmann's renovations. Prior to Haussmann, Paris buildings usually had wealthier people on the second floor (the "étage noble"), while middle class and lower-income tenants occupied the top floors. Under Haussmann, with the increase in rents and greater demand for housing, low-income people were unable to afford the rents for the upper floors; the top floors were increasingly occupied by concierges and the servants of those in the floors below. Lower-income tenants were forced to the outer neighbourhoods, where rents were lower.

== The Haussmannian works in art ==
Haussmann's renovation of Paris attracted a number of artists, notably painters. Gustave Caillebotte "was constantly searching for contemporary, innovative, modern subjects. And Baron Haussmann's transformed Paris was an astonishing source of inspiration for him." Le Figaro writes: "Witnesses to this major restructuring, the Impressionists mainly depicted a bustling, teeming Paris, animated by a certain liveliness." Some of the Impressionists' most famous works were painted after Napoleon III and Haussmann's downfall in 1870, but participated in widening the city's new reputation for modernity.

Haussmann's Paris by the Impressionists
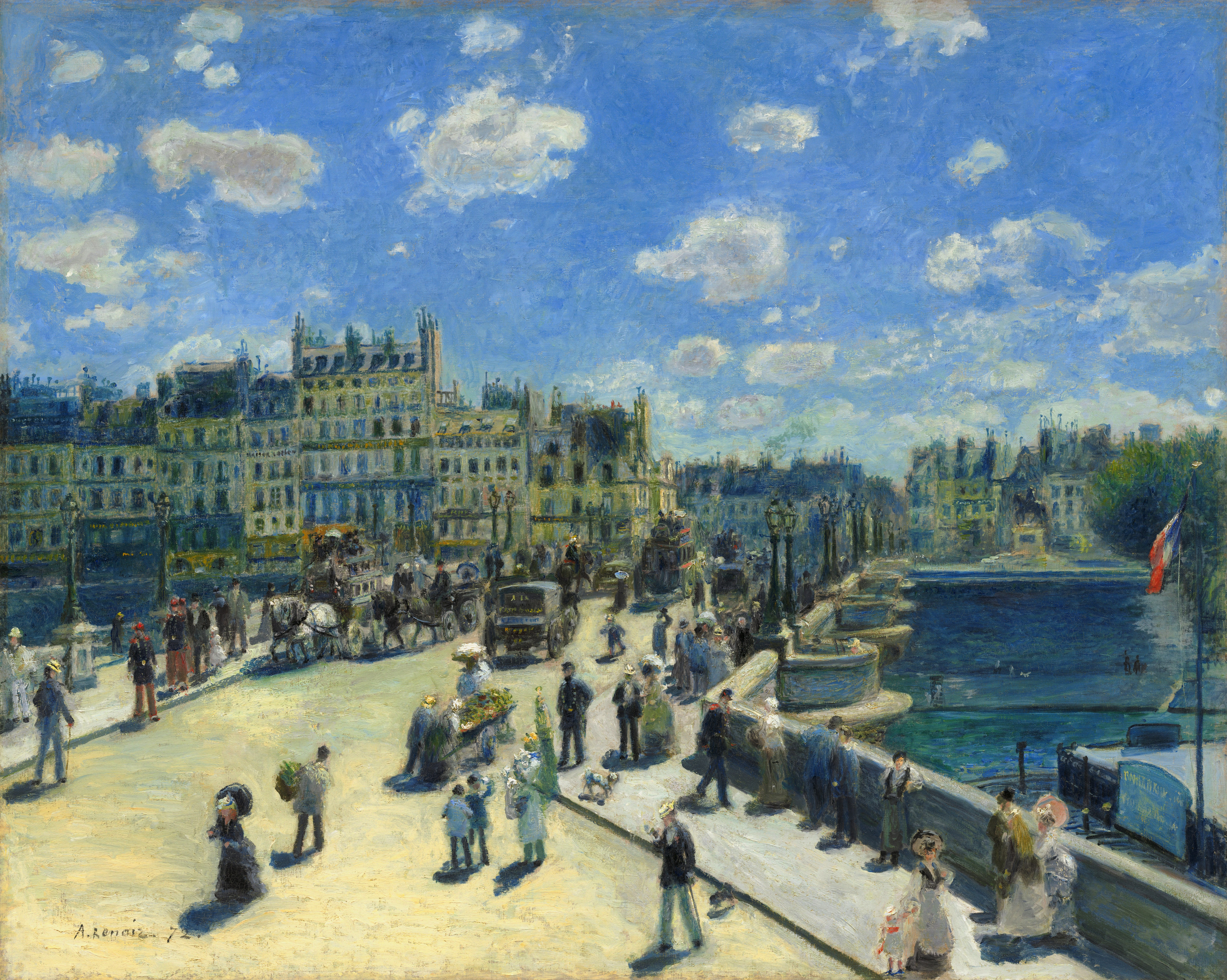
Renoir's 1872 Le Pont-Neuf, featuring the Seine

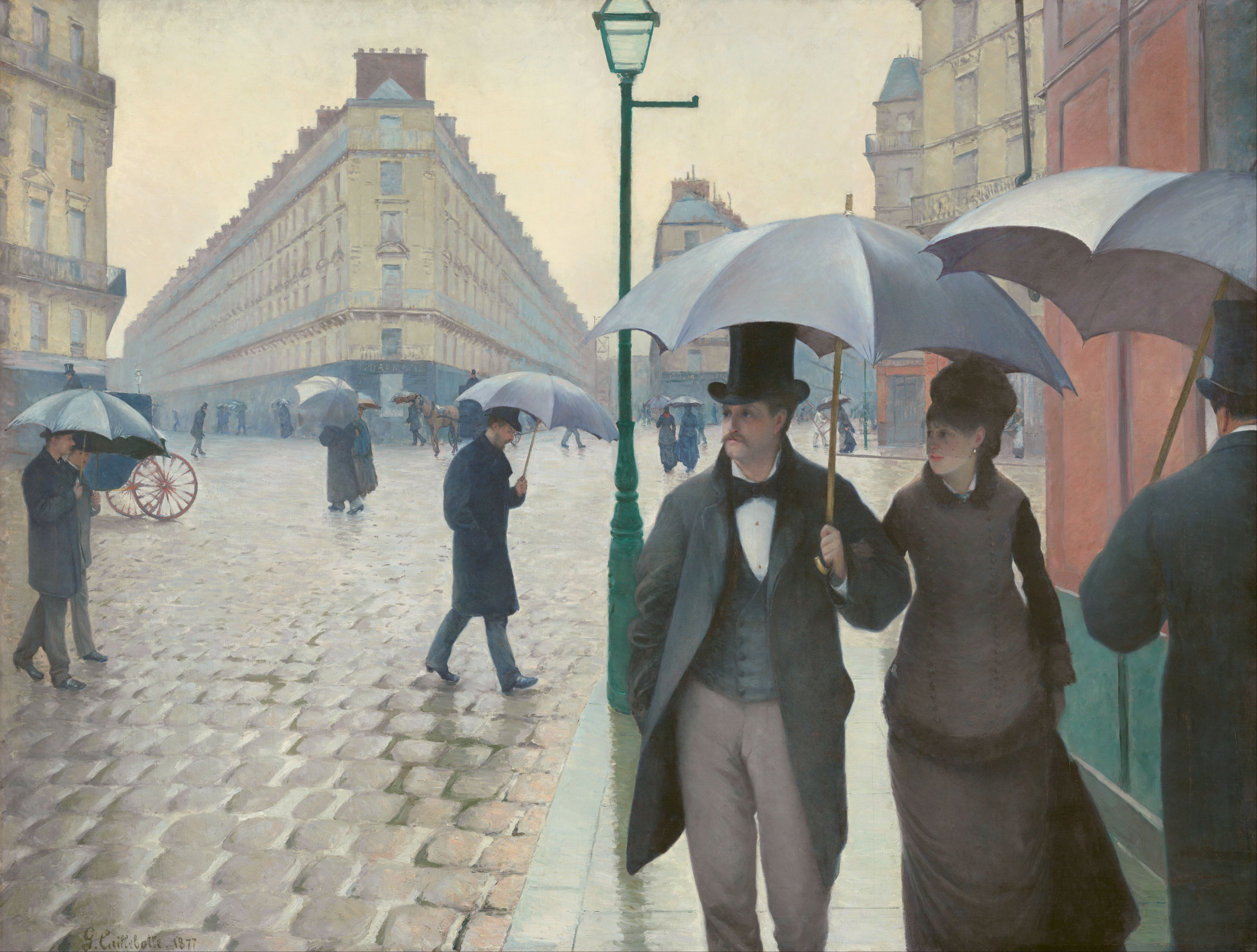
Paris Street; Rainy Day, painted in 1877 by Gustave Caillebotte, depicts the wide boulevards of Haussmann's Paris in an Impressionist style.

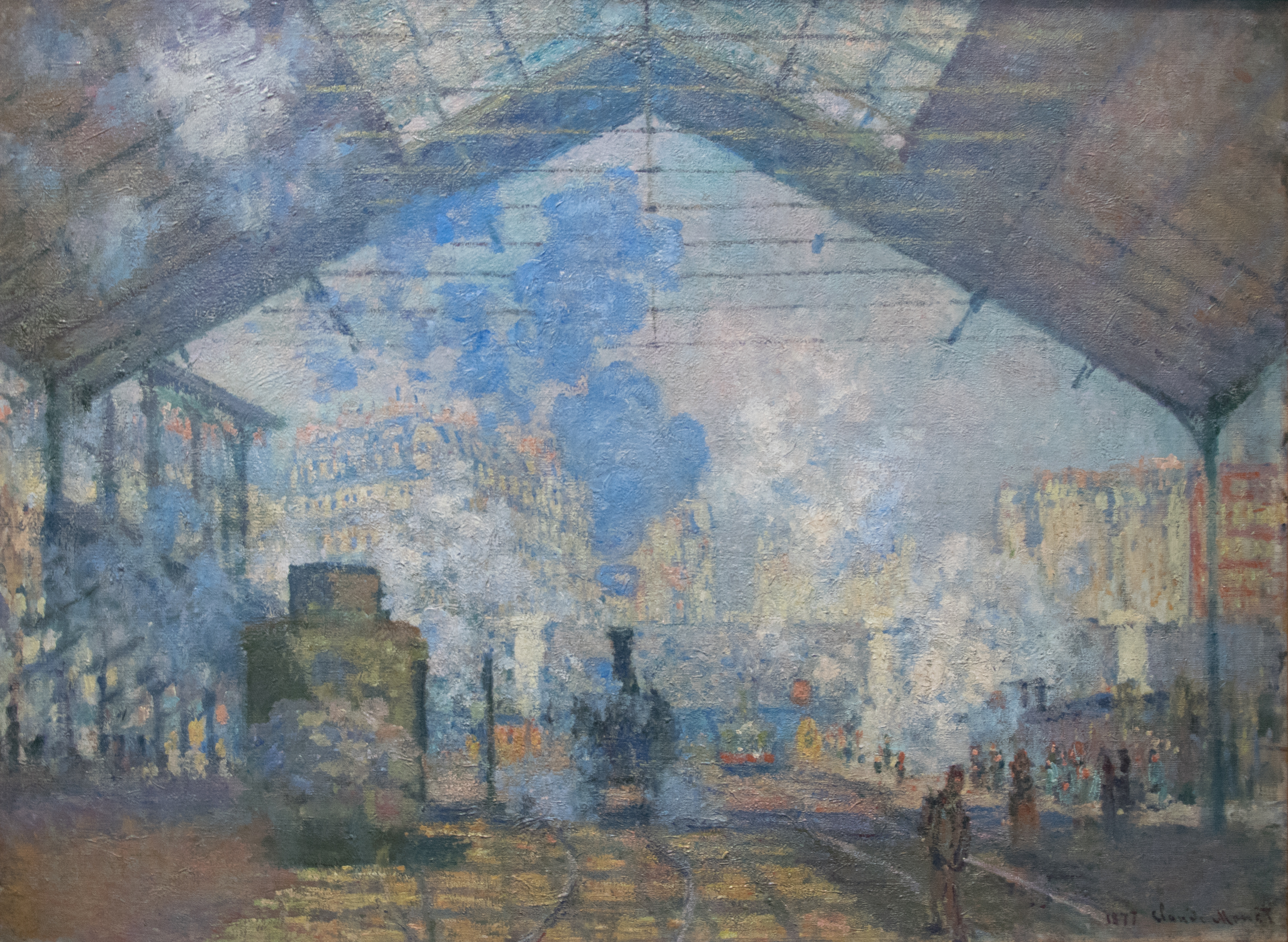
Claude Monet's La Gare Saint-Lazare is part of a wider 1877 series.

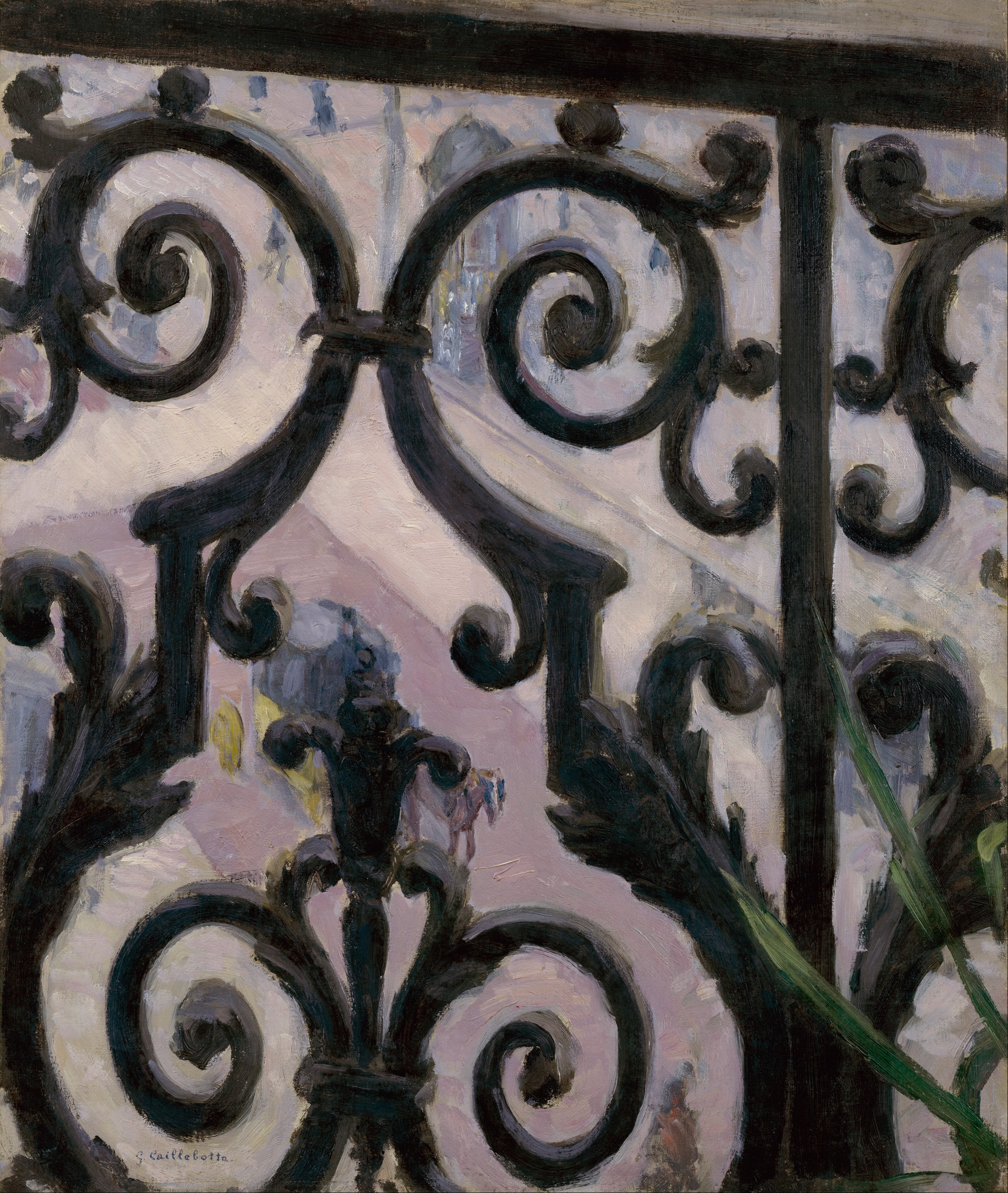
Detail of a Haussmannian balcony by Caillebotte, 1880

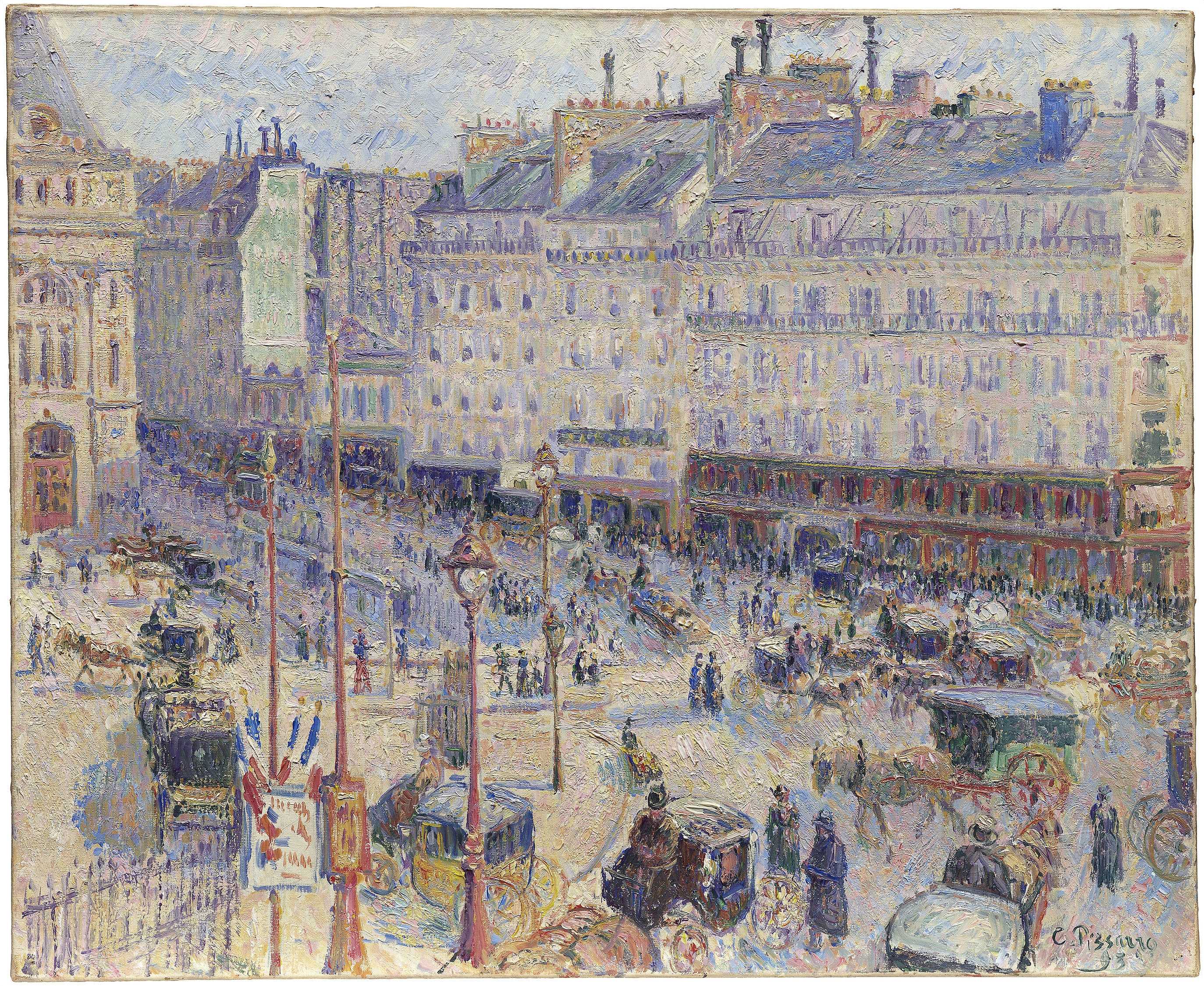
La Place du Havre (1893) by Camille Pissaro

== Legacy ==
Haussmann's transformations of Paris improved the quality of life in the capital. Disease epidemics, except tuberculosis, ceased, traffic circulation improved, and new buildings were better-built and more functional than their predecessors. Haussmann's works set the stage for Paris in the Belle Époque, an era marked by optimism.

The end of "pure Haussmannism" can be traced to urban legislation of 1882 and 1884 that ended the uniformity of the classical street, by permitting staggered façades and the first creativity for roof-level architecture. A 1902 law further liberalised restrictions.

A century after Napoleon III's reign, new housing needs and the rise of a new voluntarist Fifth Republic began a new era of Parisian urbanism. The new era rejected Haussmannian ideas as a whole to embrace those represented by architects such as Le Corbusier in abandoning unbroken street-side façades, limitations of building size and dimension, and even closing the street itself to automobiles with the creation of separated, car-free spaces between the buildings for pedestrians. This new model was brought into question by the 1970s, a period featuring a reemphasis of the Haussmann heritage: a new promotion of the multifunctional street was accompanied by limitations of the building model and, in certain quarters, by an attempt to rediscover the architectural homogeneity of the Second Empire street-block.

Certain Parisian suburban towns, notably Issy-les-Moulineaux and Puteaux, have built new quarters that by their name "Quartier Haussmannien" cite the Haussmannian heritage. The Belgian capital Brussels followed suit in the late 1800s, and conducted an extensive demolition and renovation, but on a smaller scale compared to Paris. Brussels carved out new central boulevards that were straight lined and flanked by Haussmann style rows of apartments.

In Marseille, a notable example of local Haussmannian architecture is the Rue de la République (former Rue Impériale), which runs from the Old Port to La Joliette. In Lyon under the Second Empire, prefect of the Rhône Claude-Marius Vaïsse directed vast renovation works on the Presqu'île, similar to Haussmann's renovation of Paris.

In North America, the city of Boston followed the Haussmann style when creating the new neighbourhood of Back Bay.

In Brazil, the city of Rio de Janeiro (then Federal District) went through a similar urban renovation under mayor Pereira Passos, who studied in France during the time Haussmann's works were changing Paris. His vision was to turn Rio into a "Tropical Paris", and the period of the renovations has become known as "O Bota Abaixo" (the teardown), due to the demolition of manors and hills in the city center.

== See also ==
- Paris during the Second Empire
- Demographics of Paris
- Hobrecht-Plan, a similar 1850s urban planning approach in Berlin, conducted by James Hobrecht
- Plan Voisin, a modernist plan for Paris proposed in the 1920s
