= Embassy of Canada, Paris =

Diplomatic mission of Canada to France

Embassy of Canada in France
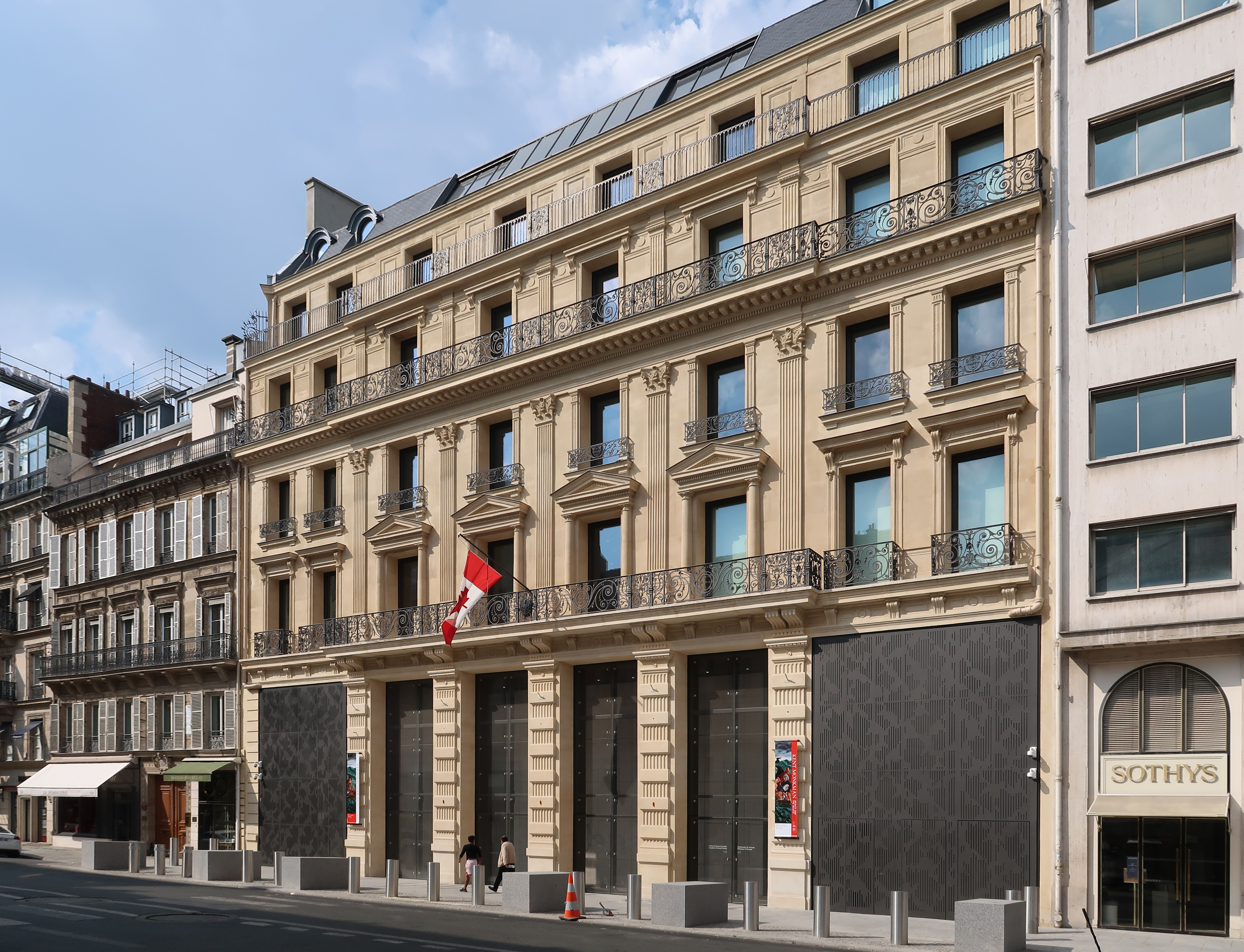
- The embassy in July 2018
- Location: Paris, France
- Address: 130 rue du Faubourg Saint-Honoré, Paris 75008
- Coordinates: 48°52′20.6″N 2°18′44.6″E
- Ambassador: Stephane Dion
- Website: Official website

The Embassy of Canada in France (French: Ambassade du Canada en France) is the main diplomatic mission of Canada to the French Republic. As of May 2, 2018, the embassy and the Canadian Cultural Centre relocated to 130 rue du Faubourg Saint-Honoré in the 8th arrondissement of Paris, which underwent renovation for that purpose. Previously, the embassy was located at 35 avenue Montaigne, and the Canadian Cultural Centre was located at 5 rue de Constantine in Paris.

The Canadian ambassador's official residence is located at 135 rue du Faubourg Saint-Honoré. Paris is also home to Canada's permanent delegations to UNESCO and the OECD, which are housed separately. In addition, the Government of Quebec has a delegation in Paris, which is located at 66 rue Pergolèse in the 16th arrondissement.

== History ==
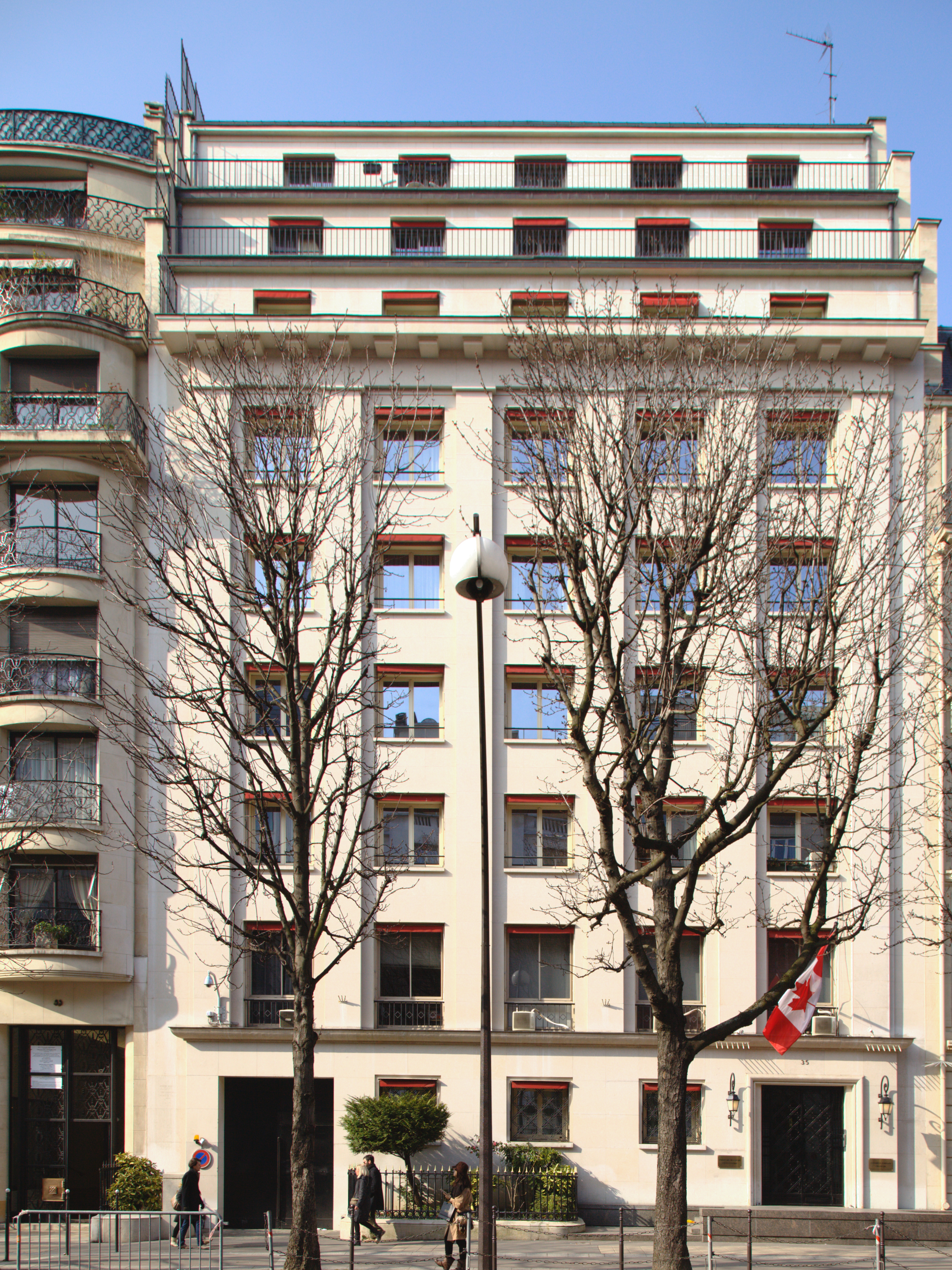
Former embassy building at 35 avenue Montaigne in Paris

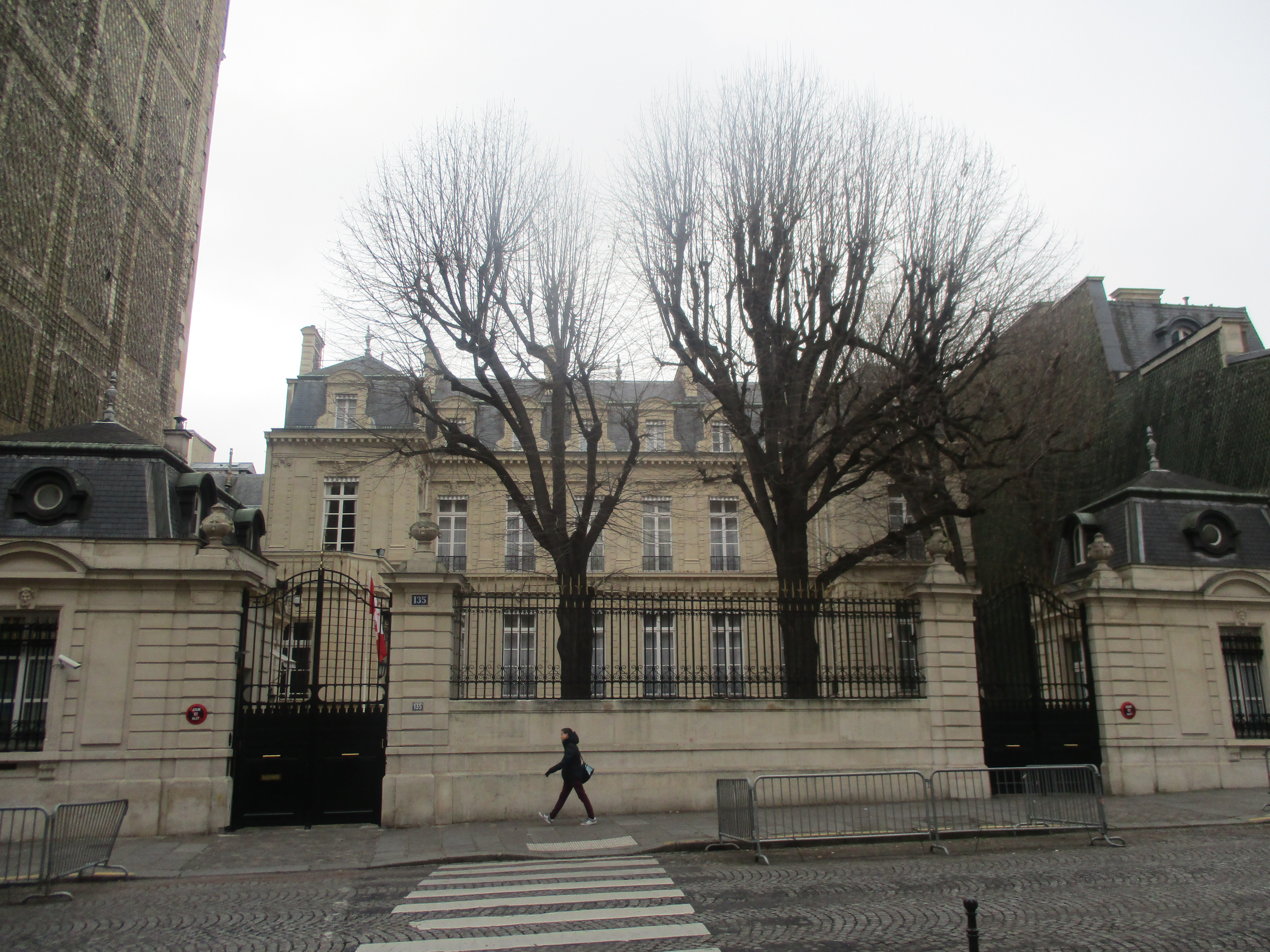
Residence of the Ambassador of Canada in Paris

The embassy is the oldest posting in the Canadian foreign service (in its early history, the Canadian government did not view the United Kingdom as a foreign country, as Canada formed part of the British Empire). Canada's presence in Paris began in 1882 and was precipitated by the actions of the province of Quebec. The provincial government had appointed Hector Fabre, a former journalist and senator, as its representative in France. The Canadian federal government took advantage of this presence to name him Canada's "agent" and later "commissioner" in France, although he held no diplomatic rank or status. Fabre was theoretically supposed to report to the Canadian High Commission in London, but in practise had little oversight.

In 1911, Philippe Roy became Canada's and Quebec's "commissioner general" in France, by the appointment of the Laurier Liberals. The incoming Tory government disapproved of the potential conflicts-of-interest that could result from his serving both roles, and he resigned from the Quebec position. In 1914, as most of the foreign representatives in Paris evacuated because of the threatening German Army, Roy remained in Paris.

By January 1928, the Canadian office in Paris had been promoted to a formal legation, and Roy became "minister" to France, presenting his credentials on September 19, 1928, but still under the British ambassador.

During the Second World War, after the Fall of France in 1940, Canada's minister in Paris, Georges Vanier, fled to London. Canada did not send a representative to the Vichy regime but still technically maintained relations, allowing Vanier to return to visit France several times. Once Canada shifted recognition to the Free French under Charles de Gaulle, Vanier dealt with them in London. After the liberation of France, the legation became an embassy and Vanier became Canada's first ambassador in 1944.

The embassy is one of Canada's largest missions in Europe, with about 60 Canada-based diplomats and 170 locally-employed staff working at the chancery and the Canadian Cultural Centre (both at 130 rue du Faubourg Saint-Honoré), as well as the ambassador's official residence (at 135 rue du Faubourg Saint-Honoré).

== See also ==
- Canada–France relations
- List of ambassadors of Canada to France
