= Boulevard Malesherbes =

Boulevard in Paris, France

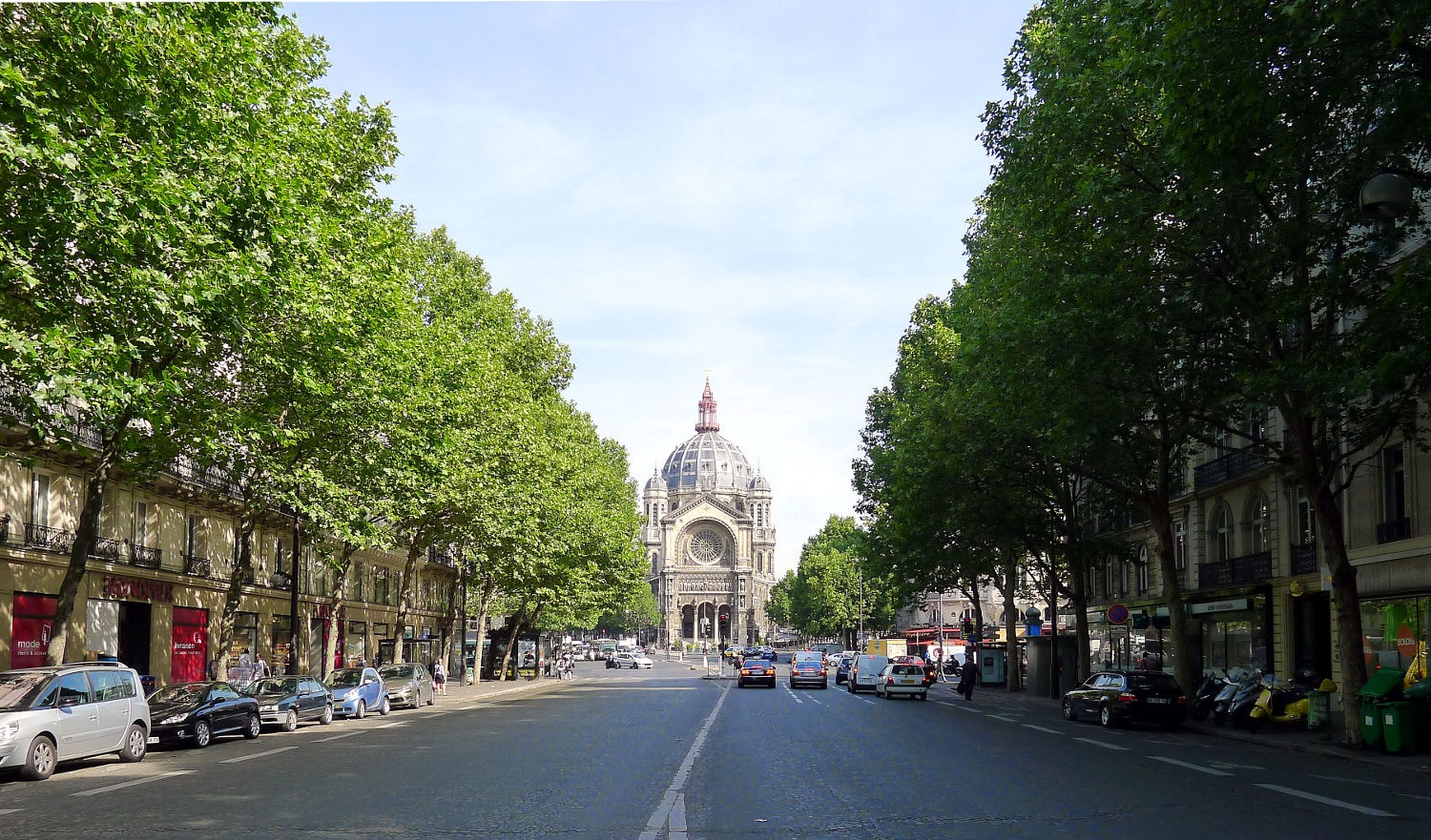
- Boulevard Malesherbes looking northwest towards the Église Saint-Augustin

- Location within Paris
- Namesake: Guillaume-Chrétien de Lamoignon de Malesherbes
- Length: 2,650 m (8,690 ft)
- Width: 46 m (151 ft)
- Arrondissement: 8th, 17th
- Quarter: Quartier de la Madeleine, Quartier de l'Europe
- Coordinates: 48°52′47″N 2°18′50″E
- From: Place de la Madeleine
- To: Boulevard Berthier

Construction
- Inauguration: August 13, 1861

The Boulevard Malesherbes (French pronunciation: [bulvaʁ malzɛʁb]) is a boulevard in central Paris, France, running northwest between the Church of the Madeleine in the 8th arrondissement, and the Porte d'Asnières in the 17th arrondissement. It is one of the streets created during the renovations of Paris undertaken by the Prefect of the Seine, Georges-Eugene Haussmann, in the 1850s and 1860s.

== History ==
The creation of the Boulevard Malesherbes was first decreed by Napoléon I in 1808, as part of his reconfiguration of the area around the Madeleine. A second artery was judged necessary in order to create balance with the rue de la Madeleine to the east of the Madeleine. The two streets branch off of the Rue Royale at angles and form an emplacement for the Madeleine. It is named in honor of Guillaume-Chrétien de Lamoignon de Malesherbes, a minister and official under Louis XV and Louis XVI who was executed by guillotine during the Revolution. Only a rudimentary street was formed near the Madeleine; in 1852 the city resurrected the plans in order to ease the traffic between the Madeleine and the Monceau barrier. The plans were again put on hold as Paris prepared for the Exposition Universelle in 1855.

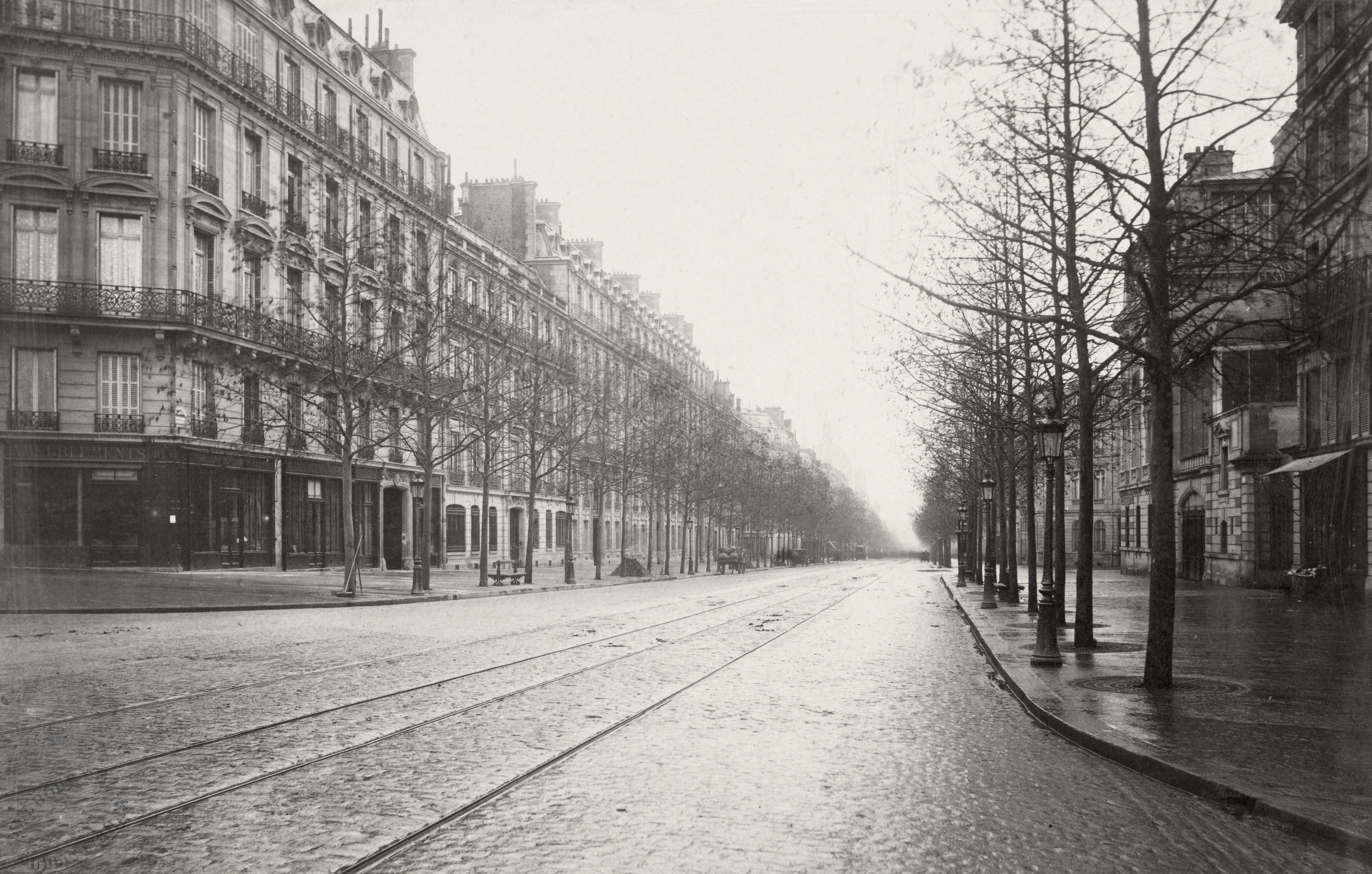
Charles Marville, Boulevard Malesherbes, from the Boulevard de Courcelles, ca. 1853–70

In 1858, the Prefect of the Seine, Georges-Eugene Haussmann, entered into an agreement with the government of Napoléon III over a program of public works for Paris. The fourth paragraph of the treaty signed between the two parties provided specifically for the creation of the Boulevard Malesherbes. In 1860, the city reached an agreement with a group of private developers in order to extend the boulevard beyond the Parc Monceau. This group surrendered 82,625 square meters of land to the city, allowing it to build the Boulevard Malesherbes, avenue de Villiers, Avenue de Wagram, Place de Wagram, and Place Pereire. The city, in turn, agreed to sell two thirds of the former royal park to the developers. With the Boulevard Malesherbes, the consortium of developers gained a direct artery into the most fashionable parts of Paris for their new development. The angle of the street shifted slightly to the west at its intersection with Boulevard Haussmann and Rue de la Pépinière to head in the direction of the Parc Monceau and the Porte d'Asnières. At this intersection, Victor Baltard designed the Church of Saint-Augustin to fit onto a small site, so that its dome was on axis with the Boulevard Malesherbes and the Avenue de Friedland.

Unlike the previous works undertaken by the Haussmann administration, which had affected working class and poor areas of the city, the Boulevard Malesherbes was controversial because it passed through the St. Honoré neighborhood, bisecting some of Paris's most exclusive streets (the rue de la Ville-l'Évêque, the rue Lavoisier, and the rue de Rumfort). This required the expropriation and demolition of numerous mansions in its path. A hill with a densely built slum on top of it, known as the Petite Pologne, was also leveled to make way for the boulevard. In all, 84 houses were demolished to make way for the Boulevard Malesherbes. Construction had barely begun at the beginning of 1861, but proceeded at a feverish pace in advance of the inauguration that August. 300,000 cubic meters of earth were removed, the expropriated structures demolished, the surface of the road laid, trees planted, and street lamps installed within this time period. By the time of the inauguration, 114 new buildings had gone up along the boulevard.

The opening of the boulevard on August 13, 1861, was "the great event of the year". The whole route was lined with banners hung from masts, festoons, and shields. Emperor Napoléon III and the Empress Eugénie drove down the boulevard in an open carriage, flanked on either side of the street by rows of troops and soldiers stretching from the Madeleine to the old outer boulevards. The Boulevard Malesherbes immediately became a fashionable address for Parisians.

== Notable residents ==
- The author Alexandre Dumas lived at 107 Boulevard Malesherbes in the 1860s.
- 9, Boulevard Malesherbes was the home of Marcel Proust and his family from 1873 until 1900.
- The artists Ernest Meissonnier and Edouard Detaille both took up residence on Boulevard Malesherbes in 1874.
- Boulevard Malesherbes was home to a number of famous hostesses who held salons for the artistic community of Paris in the late 19th century. The salon of Juliette Adam was at 190, Boulevard Malesherbes, that of Madame de Saint-Marceaux at No. 100.
- The famous courtesan Valtesse de la Bigne lived in a mansion built for her by the Prince de Sagan at 98, Boulevard Malesherbes. From there she hosted a salon known as the "Union of Painters". Émile Zola modelled the bedroom of his courtesan character Nana after de la Bigne's own bedroom in the Boulevard Malesherbes mansion.
- The composer Gabriel Fauré lived at No. 154 from 1886 to 1911.
- In 1909, Coco Chanel set up a studio in a bachelor pad lent to her by her lover Boy Capel at 160, Boulevard Malesherbes.
- The writer Françoise Sagan lived in No. 167 during her youth. She wrote Bonjour Tristesse there during the summer of 1953.

== Notable landmarks ==
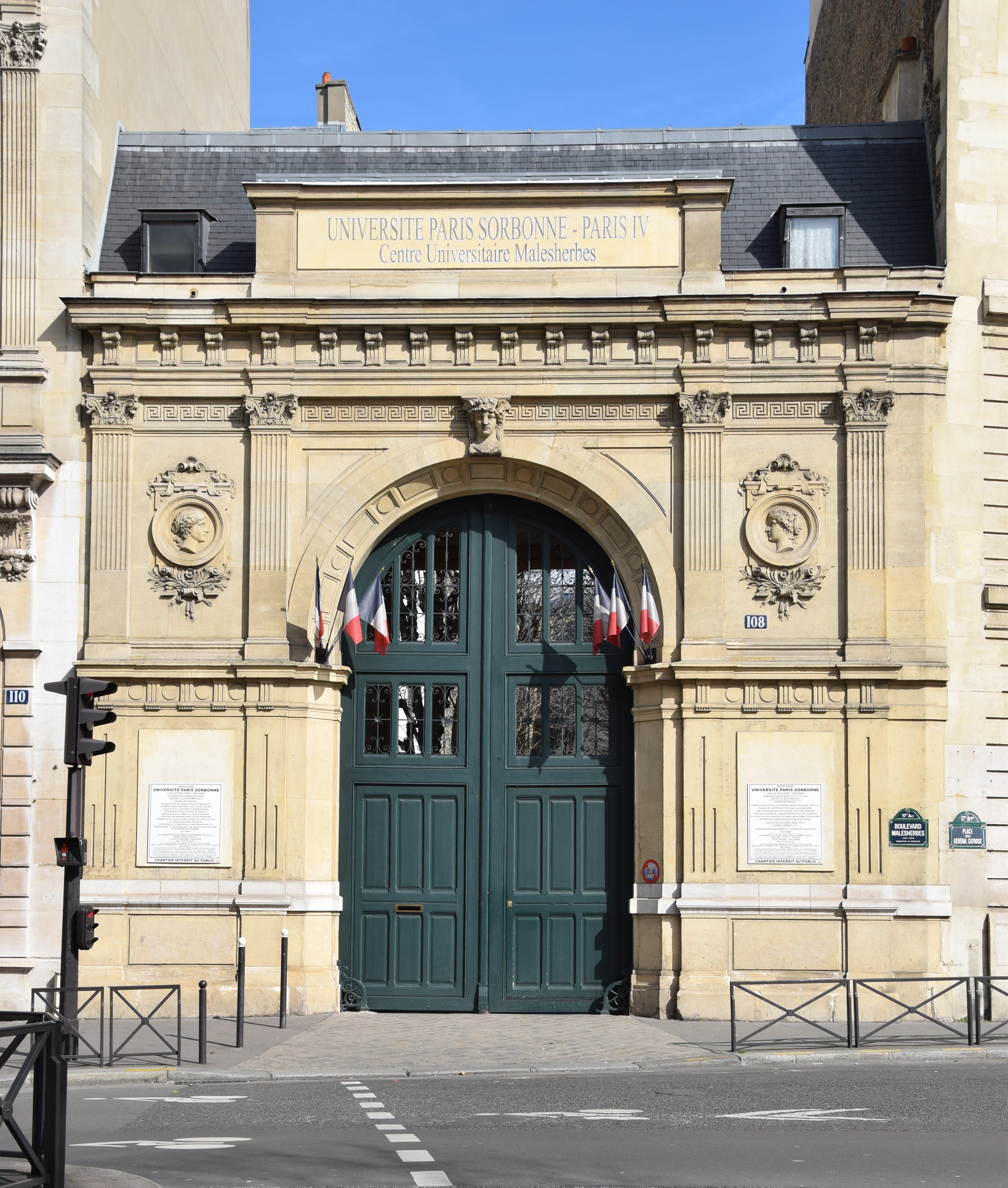
Exterior of the Sorbonne Boulevard Malesherbes campus

- Saint-Augustin, Paris is at 46, Boulevard Malesherbes. Designed by Victor Baltard, this church was built on the site of the former slum of the "Petite Pologne".
- Since 1927, the École Normale de Musique de Paris, one of France's most prestigious music conservatories, has been established at No. 114.
- The Hôtel Cail at 56, Boulevard Malesherbes houses the Mairie (town hall) annex of the 8th arrondissement and a Tribunal d'instance.
- The Consulate General of Spain is located at 165, Boulevard Malesherbes.
- The Sorbonne University has a location, called the Malesherbes Campus, on the boulevard. (former campus of HEC Paris from 1881 to 1964).
- The Lycée Carnot is located at 145, Boulevard Malesherbes.

== Transport ==
Boulevard Malesherbes is served by the Paris Metro Line 3 station of Malesherbes, at 48 avenue de Villiers. It is also close to the Métro stations of Madeleine and Saint-Augustin.
