= Rue du Faubourg Saint-Honoré =

Street in Paris, France

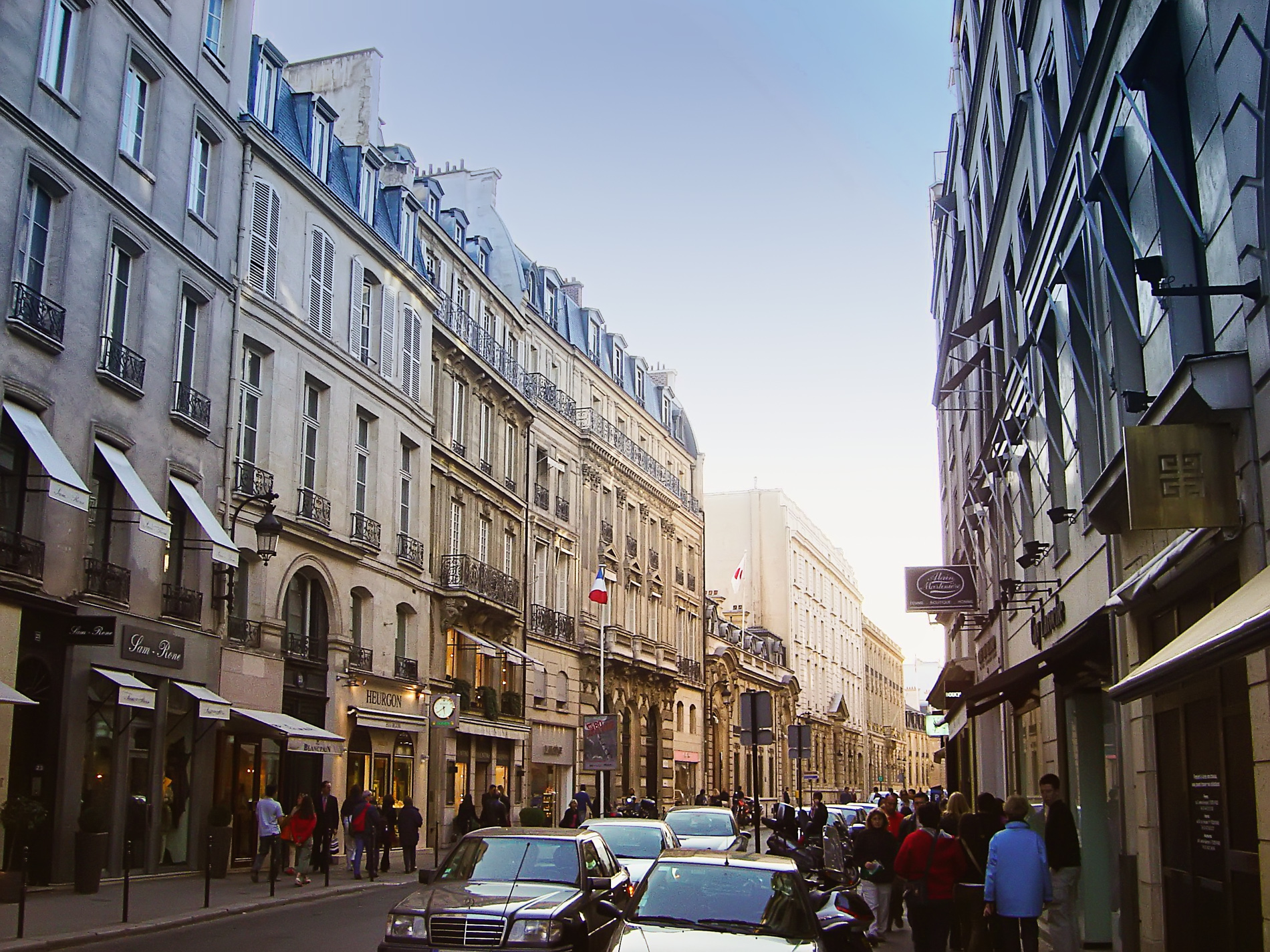
- View of the street in 2005

- Location within Paris
- Length: 2,070 m (6,790 ft)
- Width: 14.50 m (47.6 ft) between Rue Royale and Rue La Boétie; 13.80 m between Rue La Boétie and Avenue de Wagram
- Arrondissement: 8th
- Quarter: Faubourg du Roule, Madeleine
- Coordinates: 48°52′23″N 2°18′37″E
- From: 15–19 Rue Royale
- To: 46 Avenue de Wagram and 2 Place des Ternes

Construction
- Denomination: 10 December 1847

The Rue du Faubourg Saint-Honoré (pronounced [ʁy dy fobuʁ sɛ̃t‿ɔnɔʁe]) is a street located in the 8th arrondissement of Paris, France. Relatively narrow and undistinguished, especially in comparison to the nearby Avenue des Champs-Élysées, it is cited as being one of the most luxurious and fashionable streets in the world due to the presence of major global fashion houses, including the Élysée Palace (official residence of the President of France), the Hôtel de Pontalba (residence of the United States Ambassador to France), the Embassy of Canada, the Embassy of the United Kingdom, as well as numerous art galleries.

The Rue Saint-Honoré, of which the Rue du Faubourg Saint-Honoré is now an extension, began as a road extending west from the northern edge of the Louvre Palace. Saint Honoré, Honorius of Amiens, is the French patron saint of bakers.

== History ==
Until the 18th century, a few villages were dispersed in a rural area that extended west of the Louvre. The main street (a dirt road) of Roule, one of the villages, became the Rue Neuve-Saint-Honoré; it was lined and surrounded by a few mansions. The passage was upgraded in the 12th century to accommodate the increasing traffic from Paris's central market, Les Halles, to the outer villages. The market was moved in 1971 from the center of Paris to the suburb of Rungis.

The road extended to the edge or gate of Paris. The passage was renamed Rue du Faubourg Saint-Honoré when the village became an official suburb of Paris (foris burgem in Latin means "outside the city"). The passage originally extended to the Forêt de Rouvray ("oak forest"), which covered a vast area west of Paris. Remnants of it are the Bois de Boulogne, as well as the 5,100 ha Forêt Domaniale de la Londe-Rouvray in Normandy.

The Rue du Faubourg Saint-Honoré was incorporated into Paris's city limits in 1860.

== Contemporary Paris ==
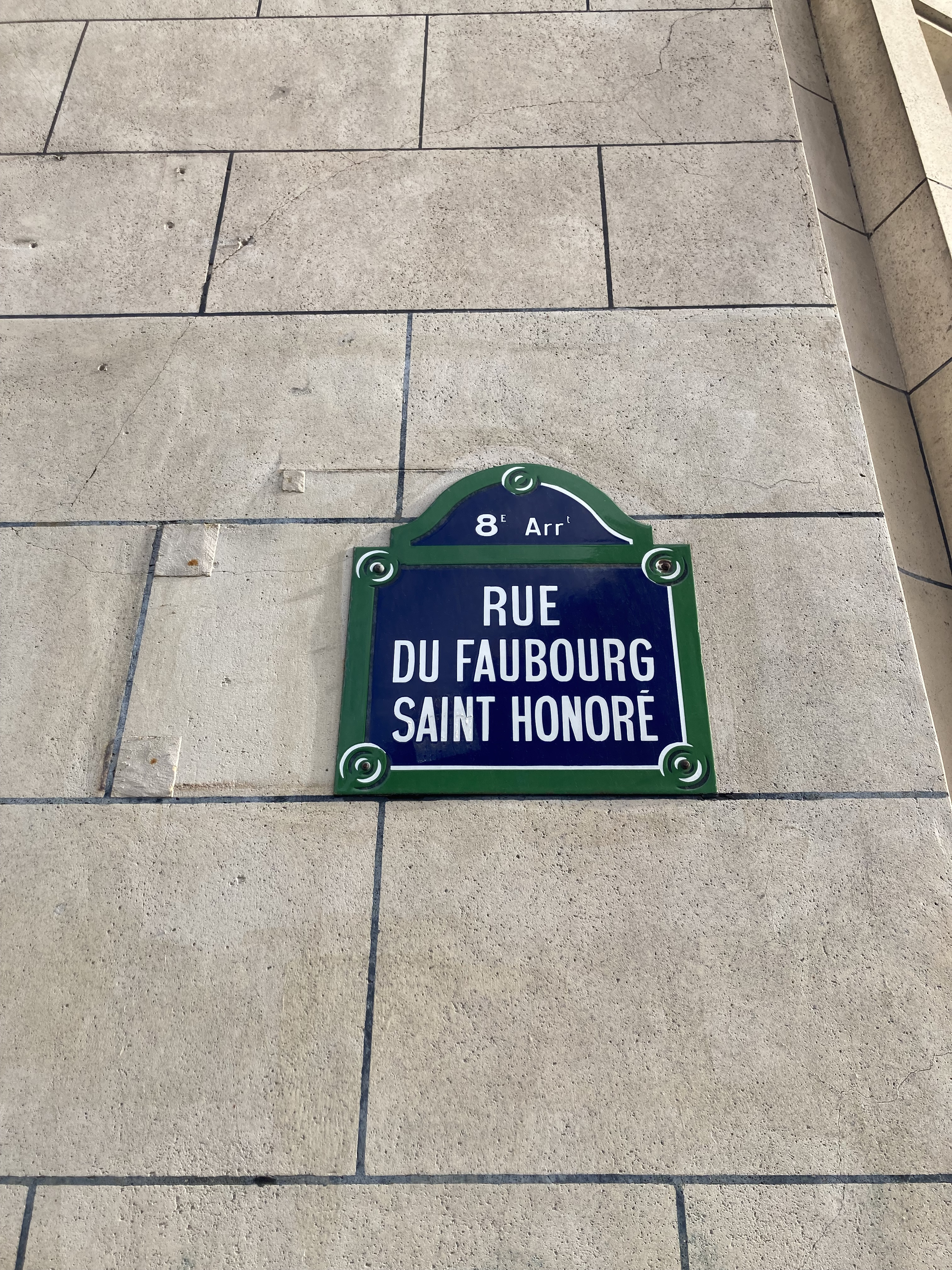
Rue du Faubourg Saint-Honoré

Depending on tradition, the reliable gauge of style in Paris and high style can be found along ten blocks of the Rue Saint-Honoré, from the Rue Cambon to the Rue des Pyramides.

== Notable buildings ==
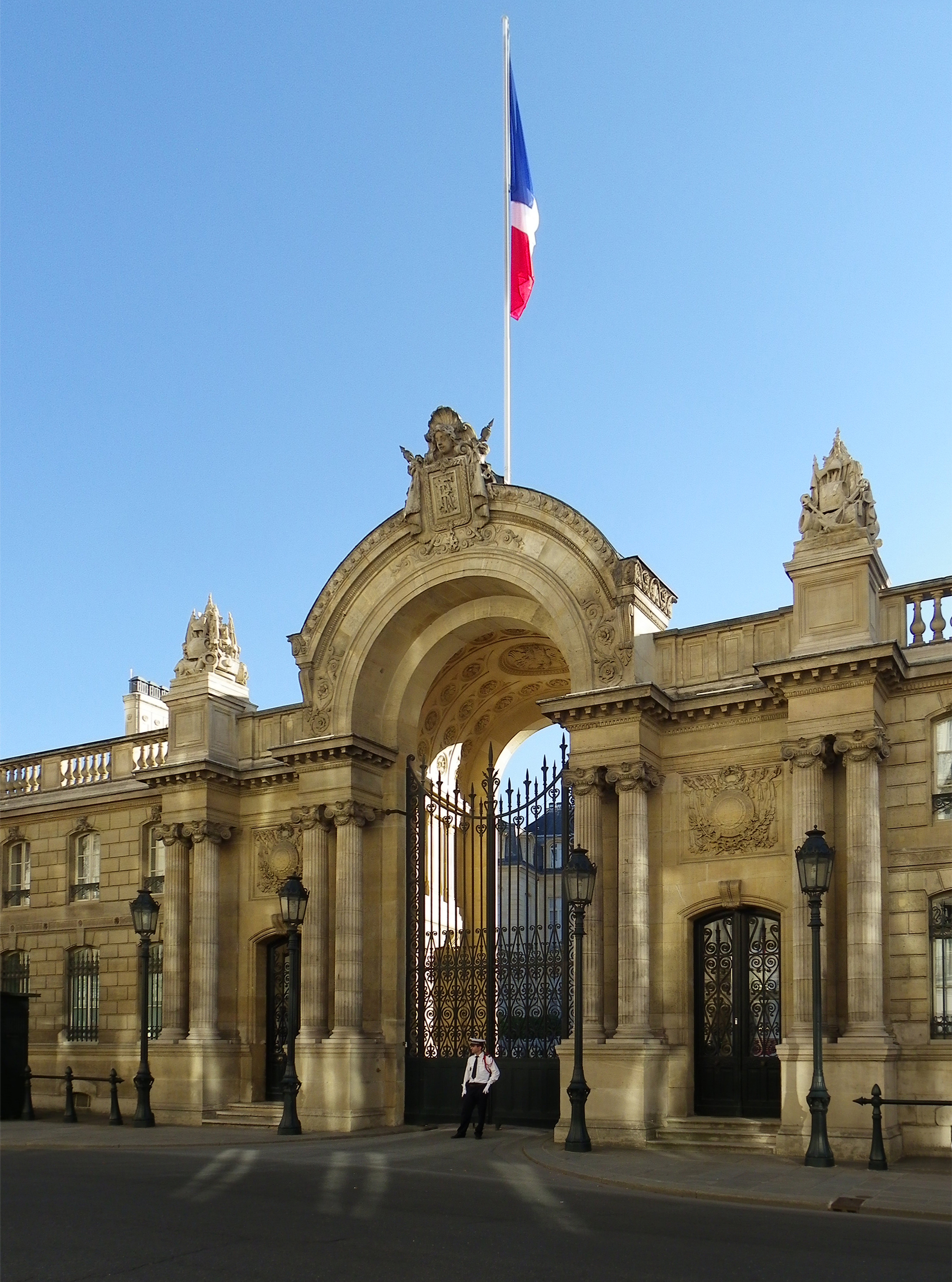
The entrance gate of the Élysée Palace, the official residence of the President of the French Republic

- No. 13: Fabergé & Cie (1924–2001).
- No. 14: The atelier and boutique of couturier Dominique Sirop, who established his enterprise in 1996 and at this location from 2000.
- No. 19: Perfumer Jean-François Houbigant established his shop, À la Corbeille de Fleurs ("at the sign of the flower basket"), in 1775.
- No. 21: Chanel boutique.
- No. 22: The flagship store of Lanvin, initially established by Jeanne Lanvin in 1889, and located here as a couture establishment after several prior locations.
- No. 24: The flagship store of Hermès, established in 1837 and located at the present address since 1880. No. 24 is also the headquarters of the Hermès Group
- No. 25: Residence of composer Igor Stravinsky, 1934–1939.
- No. 29: The institute and headquarters of Lancôme, the cosmetics brand, established in 1935.
- No. 31: The Hôtel Pillet-Will, the residence of the Japanese Ambassador to France.
- No. 33: The Hôtel Perrinet de Jars, clubhouse of the Cercle de l'Union interalliée, the building as a pair with no. 35, built in 1713.
- No. 35: The Embassy of the United Kingdom of Great Britain and Northern Ireland, purchased by the British government in 1947 and altered.
- No. 39: The Hôtel de Charost, the official residence of the British Ambassador to France.
- No. 41: The Hôtel de Pontalba, designed by Louis Visconti, now the residence of the United States Ambassador to France, having been purchased by the American government in 1948.
- No. 55: The Élysée Palace, originally the Hôtel d'Évreux, completed and decorated by 1722, where Napoleon signed his abdication in favor of his son on June 22, 1815. It is now the official residence of the President of the French Republic.
- No. 56: The offices of the French edition of Vogue magazine in the Publications Condé Nast Building.
- No. 58: Léo Marciano Paris.
- No. 59: Boutique Pierre Cardin.
- No. 69: Galerie d'Art Saint-Honoré.
- No. 71: The former address of Galerie J. Le Chapelin in the 1950s (now closed).
- No. 76: Galerie Charpentier, which now houses Sotheby's France.
- No. 83: Cifonelli bespoke tailoring shop.
- No. 96: Ministry of the Interior (on the Place Beauvau).
- No. 101: The flagship shop and tea room of Dalloyau, a luxury gastronomic brand name.
- No. 112: The Hôtel Le Bristol, a luxury hotel.
- No. 130: The Embassy of Canada and the Canadian Cultural Centre.
- No. 135: The residence of the Canadian Ambassador to France, formerly known as the Hôtel de Rigny or the Hôtel de Fels.
- No. 154: Église Saint-Philippe-du-Roule
- No. 222: Convent of the Dominicans. Organist Adrien Rougier played in the church of the convent.
- No. 235: Artists' studios building by Gustave Eiffel, 1850s.
- No. 252: Salle Pleyel, a concert hall named after Ignace Pleyel, an Austrian-born French composer and piano manufacturer.
- No. 260: Mariage Frères, a luxury tea company founded in 1854.

== Métro station ==
The Rue du Faubourg Saint-Honoré is:

Located near the Metro stations: Saint-Philippe du Roule and Madeleine.

It is served by the 2, 8, 9, 12, and 14 lines.

== Bibliography ==
- Galey, Bernard-Claude, Origines surprenantes des noms de villages, des noms des rues de Paris et de villes de province, Le Cherche Midi, Paris, 2004. ISBN 978-2-7491-0192-7.
- Stéphane, Bernard (author) & Giesbert, Franz-Olivier (Preface), Petite et Grande Histoire des rues de Paris, Albin Michel, Paris, 2000. ISBN 978-2-226-10879-1.
- Thorval, Anne, Promenades sur les lieux de l'histoire: D'Henri IV à Mai 68, les rues de Paris racontent l'histoire de France, Paragamme, Paris, 2004. ISBN 978-2-84096-323-3.
