= Marc Lortie =

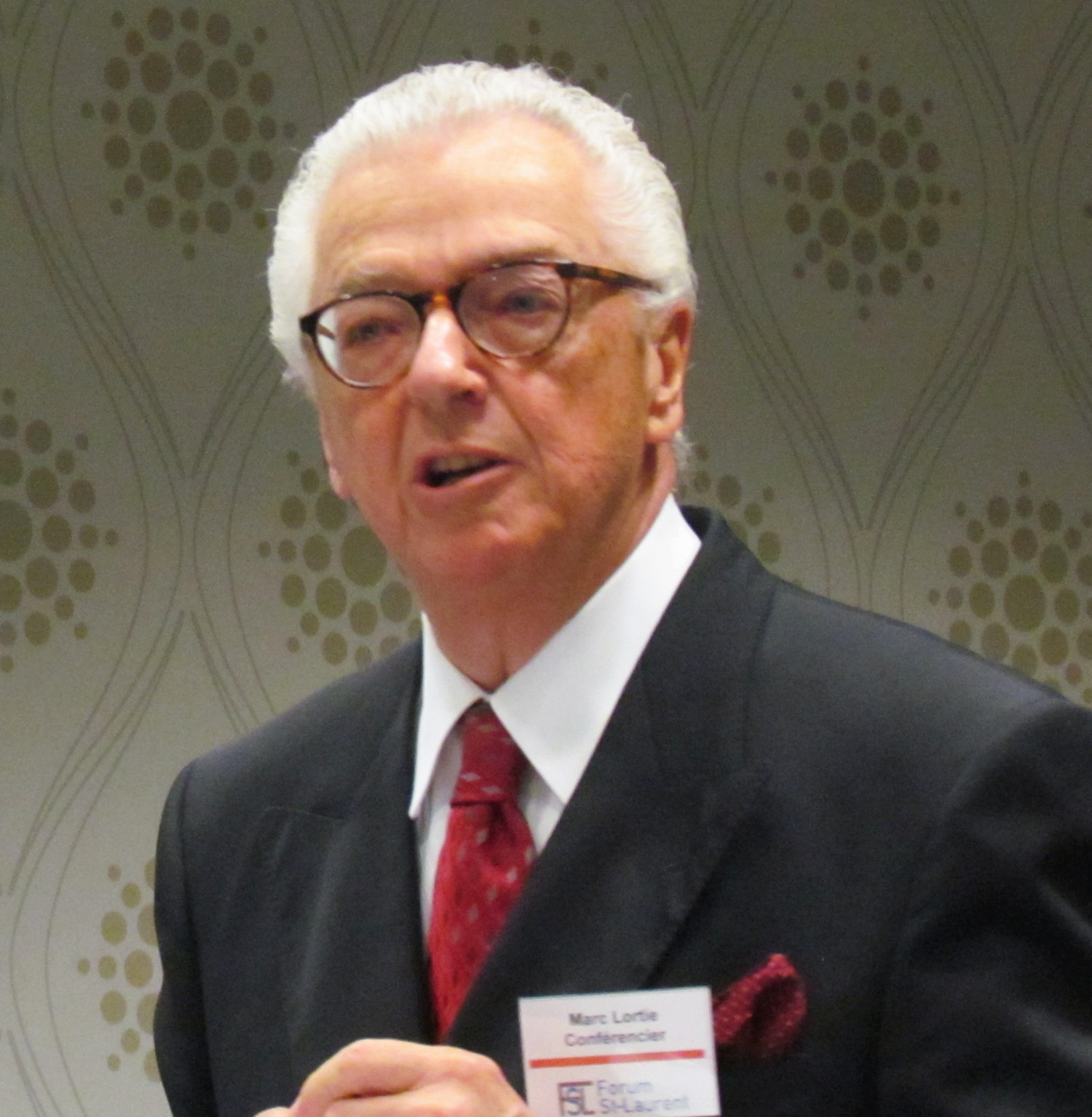

15th Canadian Ambassador to France
- In office 2007–2012
- Preceded by: Claude Laverdure
- Succeeded by: Lawrence Cannon

15th Canadian Ambassador to Andorra
- In office 2004–2007
- Preceded by: Anthony Vincent

16th Canadian Ambassador to Spain
- In office 2004–2007
- Preceded by: Alain Dudoit

11th Canadian Ambassador to Paraguay
- In office 1993–????
- Preceded by: Michael T. Mace
- Succeeded by: Robert G. Clark

20th Canadian Ambassador to Chile
- In office 1993–1997
- Preceded by: Michael T. Mace
- Succeeded by: Lawrence Lederman

Personal details
- Born: 1948 Beauport, Quebec, Canada

Marc Lortie (born 1948) is a Canadian diplomat.

After graduating from Laval University with a specialized Bachelor of Arts in Political Science (International Relations) Lortie joined the Department of External Affairs, in 1971. His responsibilities there included deployments to Tunisia and Washington, D.C. In 1985, Lortie joined the Prime Minister's Office responsible for international media relations before being assigned as press secretary in 1987.
