= Avenue des Ternes =

Avenue in Paris, France

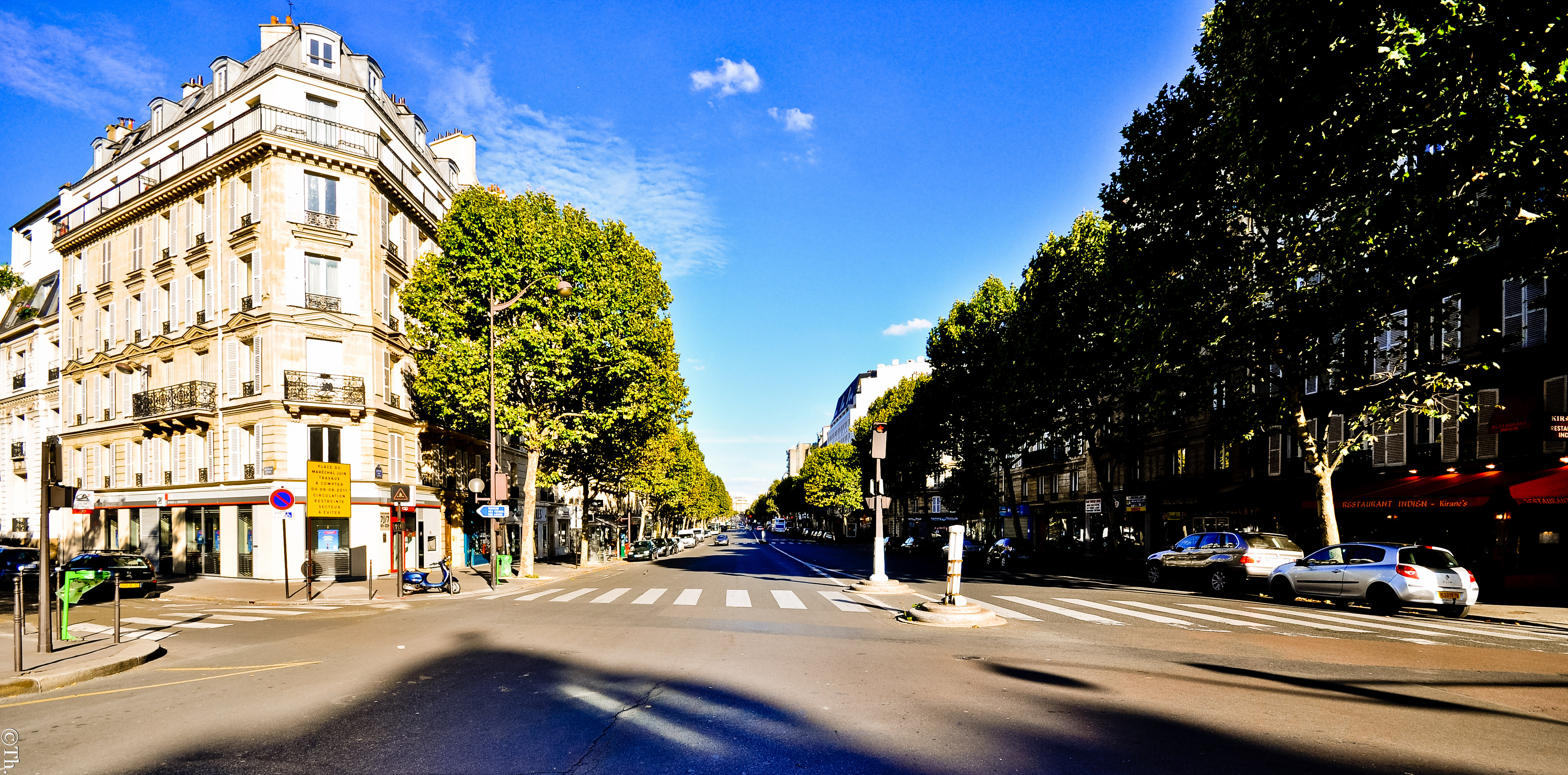
- Avenue des Ternes, August 2011

- Location within Paris
- Length: 920 m (0.57 mi)
- Width: 35 m (115 ft)
- Arrondissement: 17th
- Quarter: Ternes
- Coordinates: 48°52′45″N 2°17′29″E
- From: Place des Ternes
- To: Boulevard Gouvion-Saint-Cyr

Construction
- Denomination: 23 May 1863

The Avenue des Ternes (French pronunciation: [avny de tɛʁn]) is an avenue in the 17th arrondissement of Paris, between the Place des Ternes and the Boulevard Gouvion-Saint-Cyr. It is 920 m (0.57 mi) long and 35 m (115 ft) wide and was given its present name in 1863. It is on both sides of the Place Tristan-Bernard.

== Description ==
The Avenue des Ternes begins at the intersection of number 1, place des Ternes and number 49, avenue de Wagram. It ends at number 59, boulevard Gouvion-Saint-Cyr. It passes through the Quartier des Ternes, after which it was named on 23 May 1863.

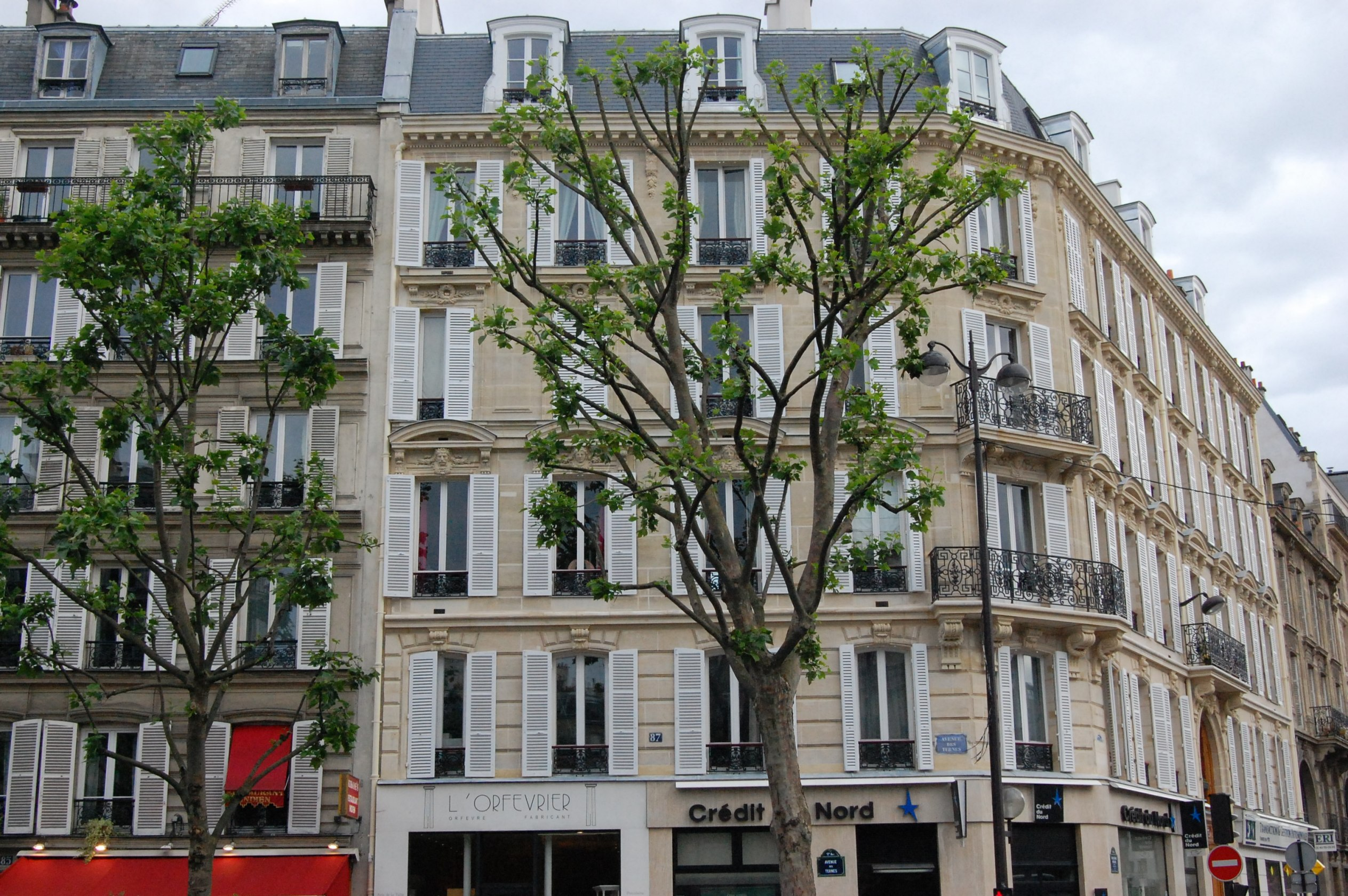
Avenue des Ternes Near Hotel Concorde La Fayette and Place du Général Kœnig.
