= List of ambassadors of Canada to France =

List of ambassadors

Ambassador of Canada to France and Monaco
- Incumbent; Nathalie Drouin since March 26, 2026
- Seat: Embassy of Canada, Paris
- Nominator: Prime Minister of Canada
- Appointer: Governor General of Canada
- Term length: At His Majesty's pleasure
- Inaugural holder: Hector Fabre
- Formation: July 12, 1882

The ambassador of Canada to France (French: Ambassadeur du Canada auprès de la France) is the official representative of the Canadian government to the government of France. The official title for the ambassador is Ambassador Extraordinary and Plenipotentiary of Canada to the French Republic (French: Ambassadeur extraordinaire et plénipotentiaire du Canada auprès de la République française). The ambassador to France also serves as the ambassador to Monaco.

The Embassy of Canada is located at 130, rue du Faubourg Saint-Honoré, 75008 Paris, France.

== History of diplomatic relations ==
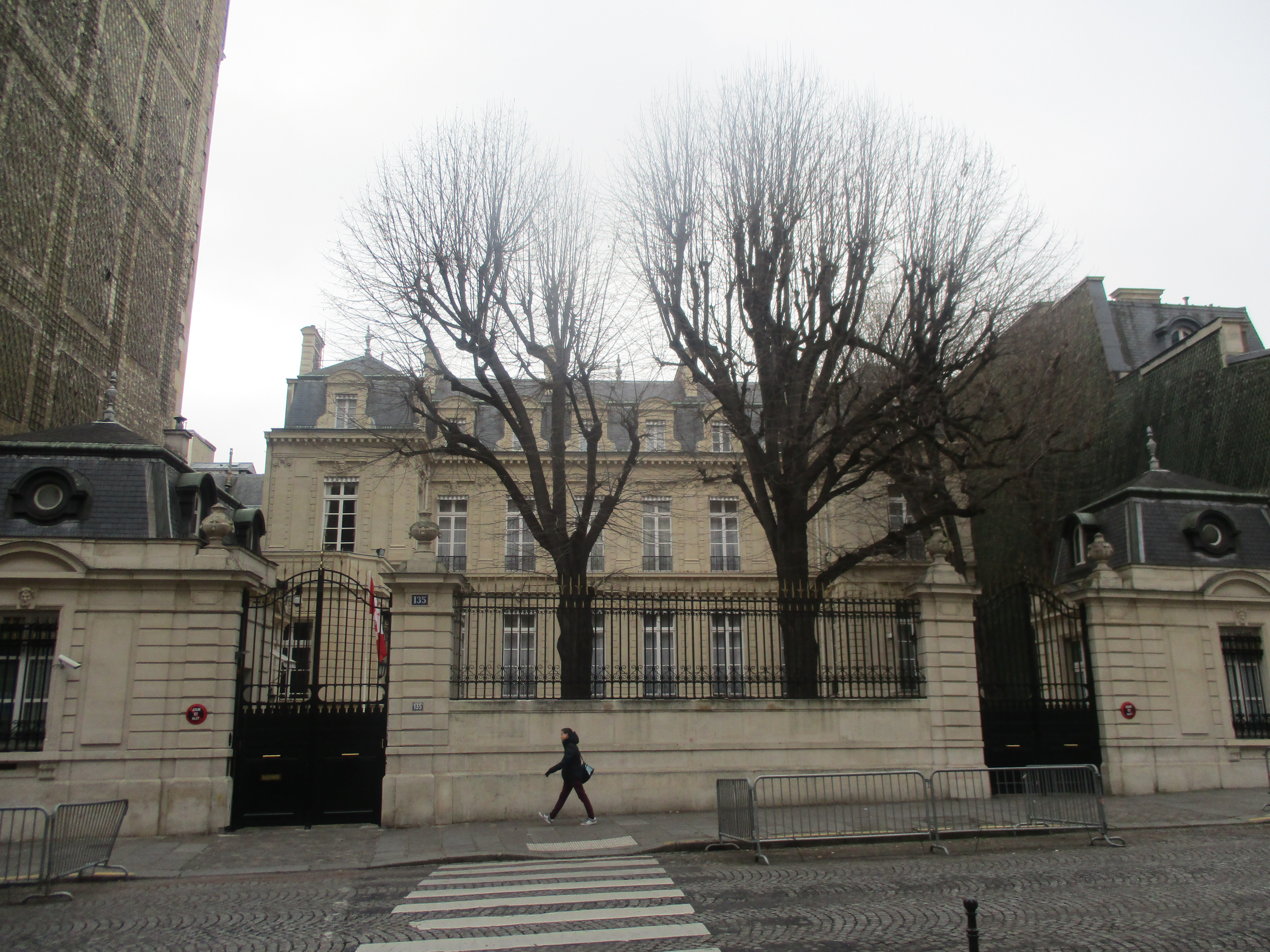
The Canadian ambassador's official residence at 135 rue du Faubourg Saint-Honoré in Paris

The mission in Paris was established in 1882, when Hector Fabre was sent to serve as an "Agent of the Dominion (of Canada)", in the form of a Commissioner. He was accorded no formal diplomatic status, however, as Britain had not accorded Canada the right to establish formal diplomatic relations with foreign states. In 1891, Fabre was succeeded by Senator Philippe Roy as Canada's Agent in France.

Official diplomatic relations between Canada and France were established on January 31, 1928, a legation was established with Philippe Roy continuing on as the first Envoy to France with diplomatic privileges on September 24, 1928. The legation moved from Paris to London on June 24, 1940, following Germany's invasion of France. Canada officially recognized the French Committee of National Liberation on August 27, 1943. Canada officially recognized the Provisional Government of the French Republic on October 23, 1944, and following the Liberation of Paris, Canada's embassy was re-established in Paris on August 24, 1944 with George Philias Vanier as Canada's first Ambassador.

Canada's mission to France is the second-oldest Canadian diplomatic post, the oldest being the Canadian High Commission in London. Technically, however, Paris is Canada's oldest foreign mission, since the diplomatic posting to London was not considered to be a "foreign" mission because Canada was a member of the British Empire.

The official residence of the Canadian ambassador is located at 135 rue du Faubourg Saint-Honoré in the 8th arrondissement of Paris. The building is known as the Hôtel de Rigny and was purchased by the Canadian government in 1950.

== List of ambassadors of Canada to France ==
No.	Name	Picture	Term of office			Career	Prime Minister nominated by	Ref.
No.	Name	Picture	Start Date	PoC.	End Date	Career	Prime Minister nominated by	Ref.
—	Agent of the Dominion (of Canada) to France							
1	Hector Fabre (Commissioner)		July 12, 1882		September 2, 1910	Non-Career	John A. Macdonald (1878–1891)	
2	Philippe Roy (Commissioner General)		May 1, 1911		September 29, 1928	Non-Career	Wilfrid Laurier (1896–1911)	
—	Envoy Extraordinary and Minister Plenipotentiary (of Canada) to France							
3	Philippe Roy		September 24, 1928	September 29, 1928	December 31, 1938	Non-Career	W. L. Mackenzie King (1926–1930 & 1935–1948)	
4	George Philias Vanier		December 12, 1938	February 21, 1939	September 14, 1940	Career	W. L. Mackenzie King (1926–1930 & 1935–1948)	
–	Pierre Dupuy (Chargé d'Affaires ad interim)		October 15, 1940		November 9, 1942	Career	W. L. Mackenzie King (1926–1930 & 1935–1948)	
–	George Philias Vanier (Representative)		November 30, 1942	November 30, 1942		Career	W. L. Mackenzie King (1926–1930 & 1935–1948)	
–	George Philias Vanier (Representative)		October 1, 1943	January 22, 1944	November 22, 1944	Career	W. L. Mackenzie King (1926–1930 & 1935–1948)	
—	Ambassador Extraordinary and Plenipotentiary of Canada to France							
5	George Philias Vanier		November 22, 1944	December 20, 1944	December 31, 1953	Career	W. L. Mackenzie King (1935–1948)	(Note: Canada officially recognized the Provisional Government of the French Republic on October 23, 1944.)
6	Jean Désy		December 17, 1953	January 4, 1954	July 1, 1958	Career	Louis St. Laurent (1948–1957)	
7	Pierre Dupuy		June 5, 1958	August 19, 1958	December 31, 1963	Career	John G. Diefenbaker (1957–1963)	
8	Jules Léger		February 20, 1964	June 1, 1964	October 31, 1968	Career	Lester B. Pearson (1963–1968)	
9	Paul André Beaulieu		September 27, 1968	December 14, 1968	September 16, 1970	Career	Pierre Elliott Trudeau (1968–1979 & 1980–1984)	
10	Léo Cadieux		July 24, 1970	October 16, 1970	September 8, 1975	Non-Career	Pierre Elliott Trudeau (1968–1979 & 1980–1984)	
11	Gérard Pelletier		September 4, 1975	December 16, 1975	July 17, 1981	Non-Career	Pierre Elliott Trudeau (1968–1979 & 1980–1984)	
12	Michel Dupuy		August 20, 1981	September 30, 1981	1985	Career	Pierre Elliott Trudeau (1968–1979 & 1980–1984)	
13	Lucien Bouchard		July 4, 1985	September 20, 1985	1988	Non-Career	Brian Mulroney (1984–1993)	
14	Claude Talbot Charland		August 18, 1988	November 22, 1988	1992	Career	Brian Mulroney (1984–1993)	
15	Benoît Bouchard		June 18, 1993	July 21, 1993	1996	Non-Career	Brian Mulroney (1984–1993)	
16	Jacques Roy		June 3, 1996	July 10, 1996	August 1, 2000	Career	Jean Chrétien (1993–2003)	
17	Raymond A.J. Chrétien		June 23, 2000	September 12, 2000	November 2003	Career	Jean Chrétien (1993–2003)	
18	Claude Laverdure		September 15, 2003	November 4, 2003	August 30, 2007	Career	Jean Chrétien (1993–2003)	
19	Marc Lortie		June 4, 2007		July 12, 2012	Career	Stephen Harper (2006–2015)	
—	Ambassador Extraordinary and Plenipotentiary of Canada to France and Monaco							
20	Lawrence Cannon		May 21, 2012	October 26, 2012	August 7, 2017	Non-Career	Stephen Harper (2006–2015)	
21	Isabelle Hudon		September 29, 2017	December 18, 2017	July 8, 2021	Non-Career	Justin Trudeau (2015–2025)	
22	Stéphane Dion		May 31, 2022	October 13, 2022	December 16, 2025	Non-Career	Justin Trudeau (2015–2025)	
23	Nathalie Drouin		February 2, 2026	March 26, 2026		Non-Career	Mark Carney (2026–present)	

== See also ==
- Canada–France relations
- Embassy of France, Ottawa
