= Place des Ternes =

Square in Paris, France

Coordinates: 48°52′41″N 2°17′53″E

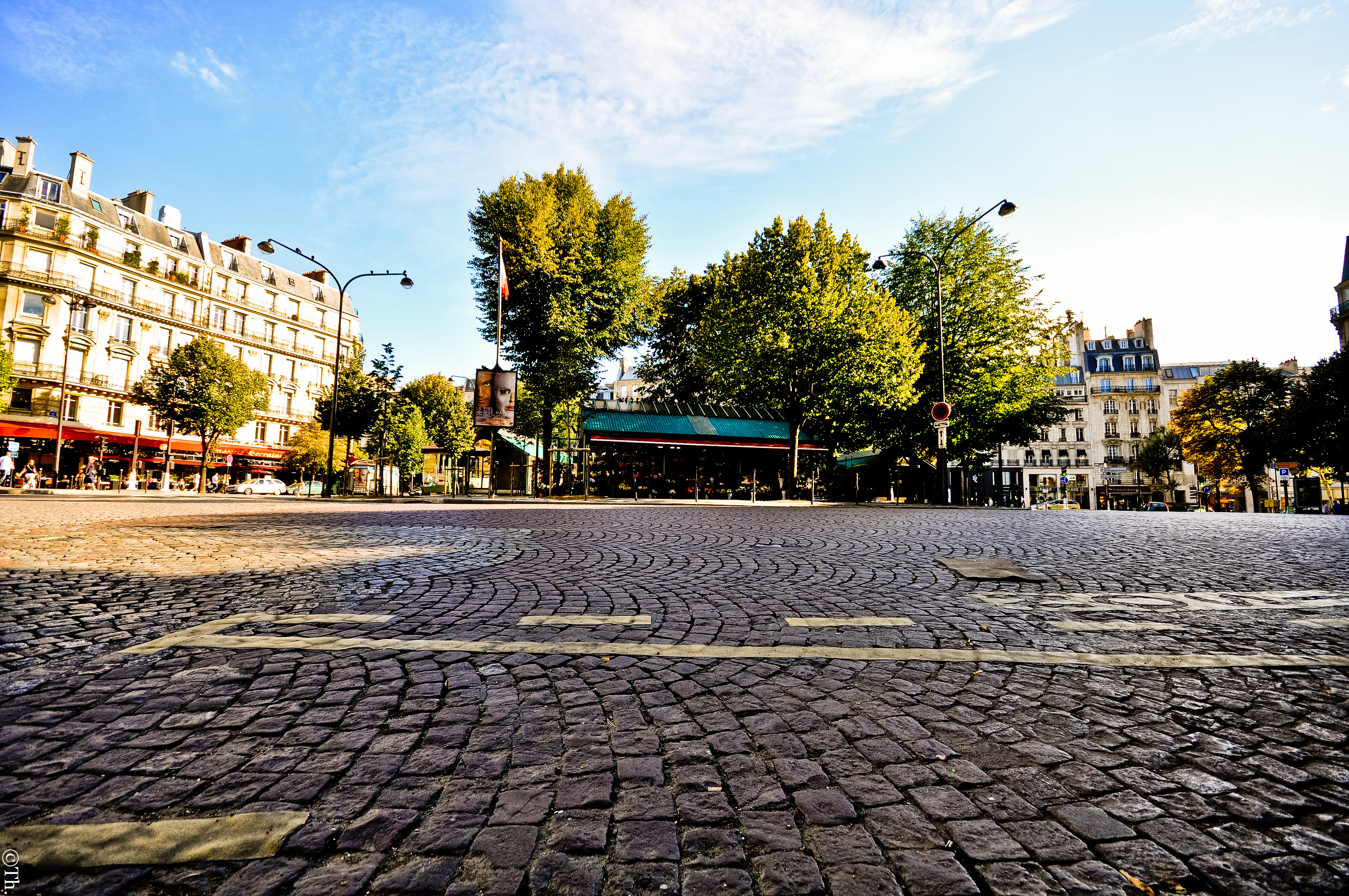
Streetview of the Place des Ternes in the morning

The Place des Ternes (French pronunciation: [plas de tɛʁn]) is a square in the 8th and 17th arrondissements of Paris, at the junction of the Avenue de Wagram, the Boulevard de Courcelles, the Rue du Faubourg-Saint-Honoré and the Avenue des Ternes. It has borne its present name since the late 19th century. In the middle of the square is the Paris Métro Line 2 station Ternes. It is located in the centre of one of the most vibrant communities of the city. The Place des Ternes is surrounded by various markets, parks, landmarks and local shops such as the Marché du Poncelet and Parc Monceau.

It takes its name from its neighborhood with the Avenue des Ternes, which crossed the old hamlet of Ternes.
