= Place de Wagram =

Square in Paris, France

Coordinates: 48.8874°N 2.3047°E

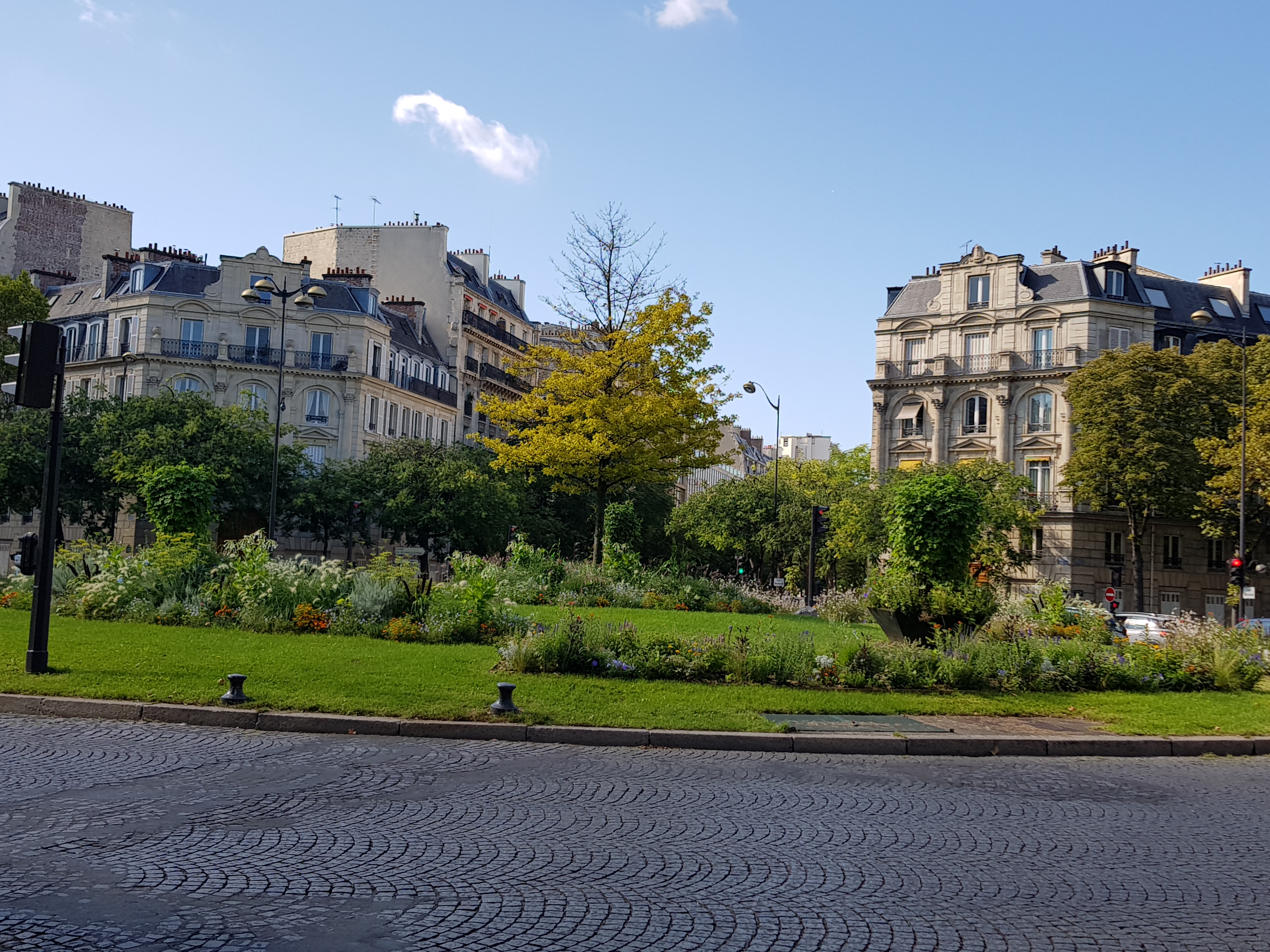
Place de Wagram

The Place de Wagram is a square in the 17th arrondissement of Paris, at the junction of the Boulevard Malesherbes, the Boulevard Pereire and the Avenue de Wagram. It forms one end of the Avenue de Wagram (the other is the Place de l'Étoile) and was renamed after the 1809 French victory at Wagram in 1868.
