= Avenue de Wagram =

Avenue in Paris, France

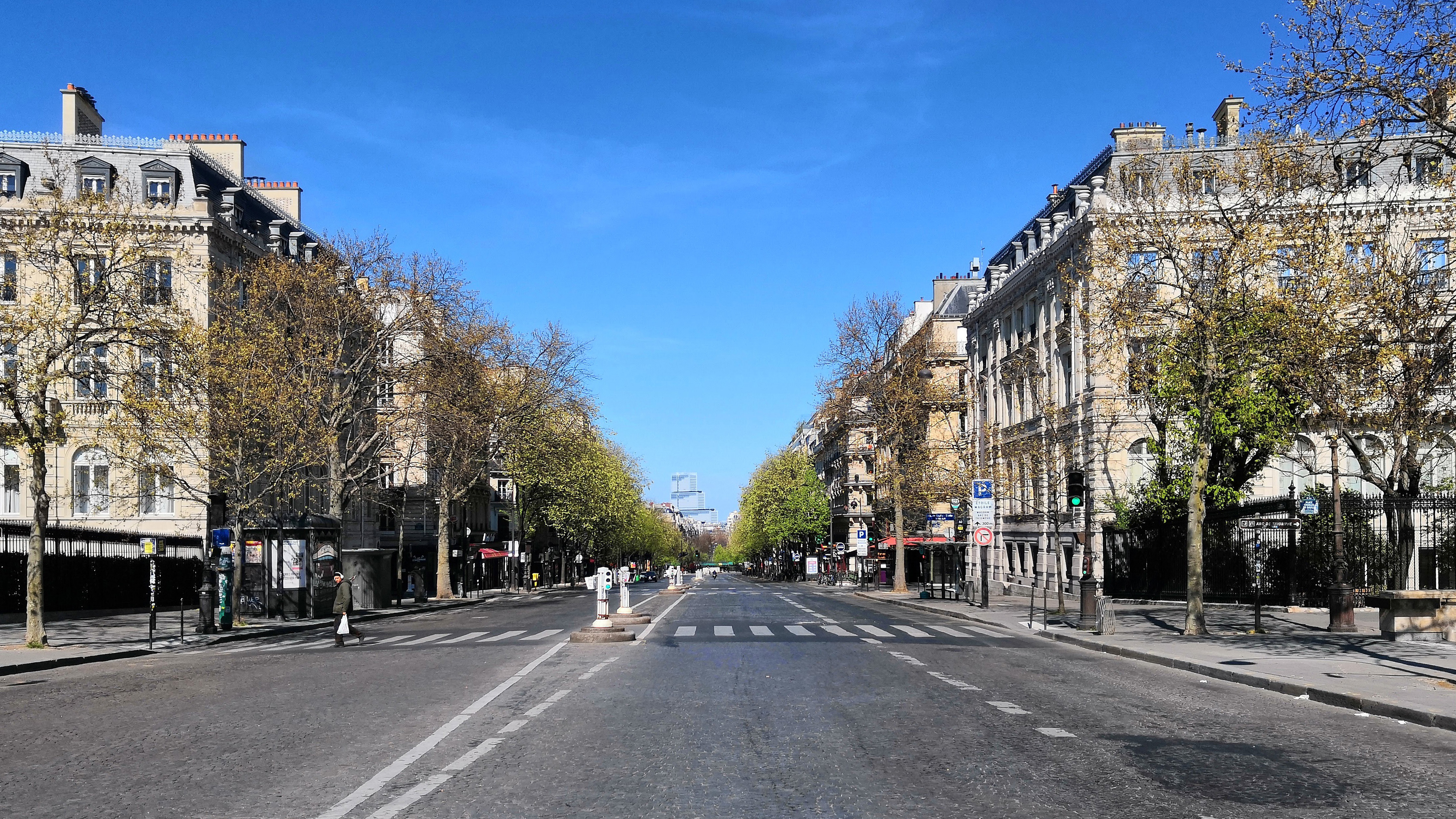
- View of Avenue de Wagram from the Place Charles de Gaulle

- Location within Paris
- Length: 1,500 m (4,900 ft)
- Width: 36 m (118 ft)
- Arrondissement: 8th, 17th
- Quarter: Faubourg-du-Roule; Ternes
- Coordinates: 48°52′51″N 2°18′00″E
- From: Place Charles de Gaulle
- To: Place de Wagram

Construction
- Completed: 1789 and 1854
- Denomination: 2 March 1864

The Avenue de Wagram is a street in the 8th and 17th arrondissements of Paris, extending from the Place de Wagram to the Place Charles de Gaulle (formerly Place de l'Étoile, and the site of the Arc de Triomphe). It is 1.5 kilometres (0.93 mi) long and 36 metres (118 ft) wide, and is divided into two sections by the Place des Ternes. It was renamed on 2 March 1864 after Napoleon's 1809 victory at the Battle of Wagram; the section between the Avenue des Ternes and the Place de l'Étoile was formerly known as the Boulevard de l'Étoile or Boulevard de Bezons and the section between the Avenue des Ternes and the Place de Wagram, as Route départementale n°6.

== History ==
The street was first opened on 16 January 1789 between the Rue de Tilsitt and the Rue du Faubourg-Saint-Honoré, then on 13 August 1854 was extended to the Place de l'Étoile.

== Buildings ==
=== Surviving ===
- Salle Wagram

== Notable inhabitants ==
- Prosper d'Épinay (1836–1914), sculptor (n° 26, in 1910).
- René Lenormand (1846–1932), composer, father of Henri-René Lenormand (1882–1951), playwright (n° 29, 5th floor).
- Madame de Thèbes (1845–1916), clairvoyant and palm reader (n° 29)
- Albert Roussel, composer (lived at n° 157 in the 1920s).

== Gallery ==
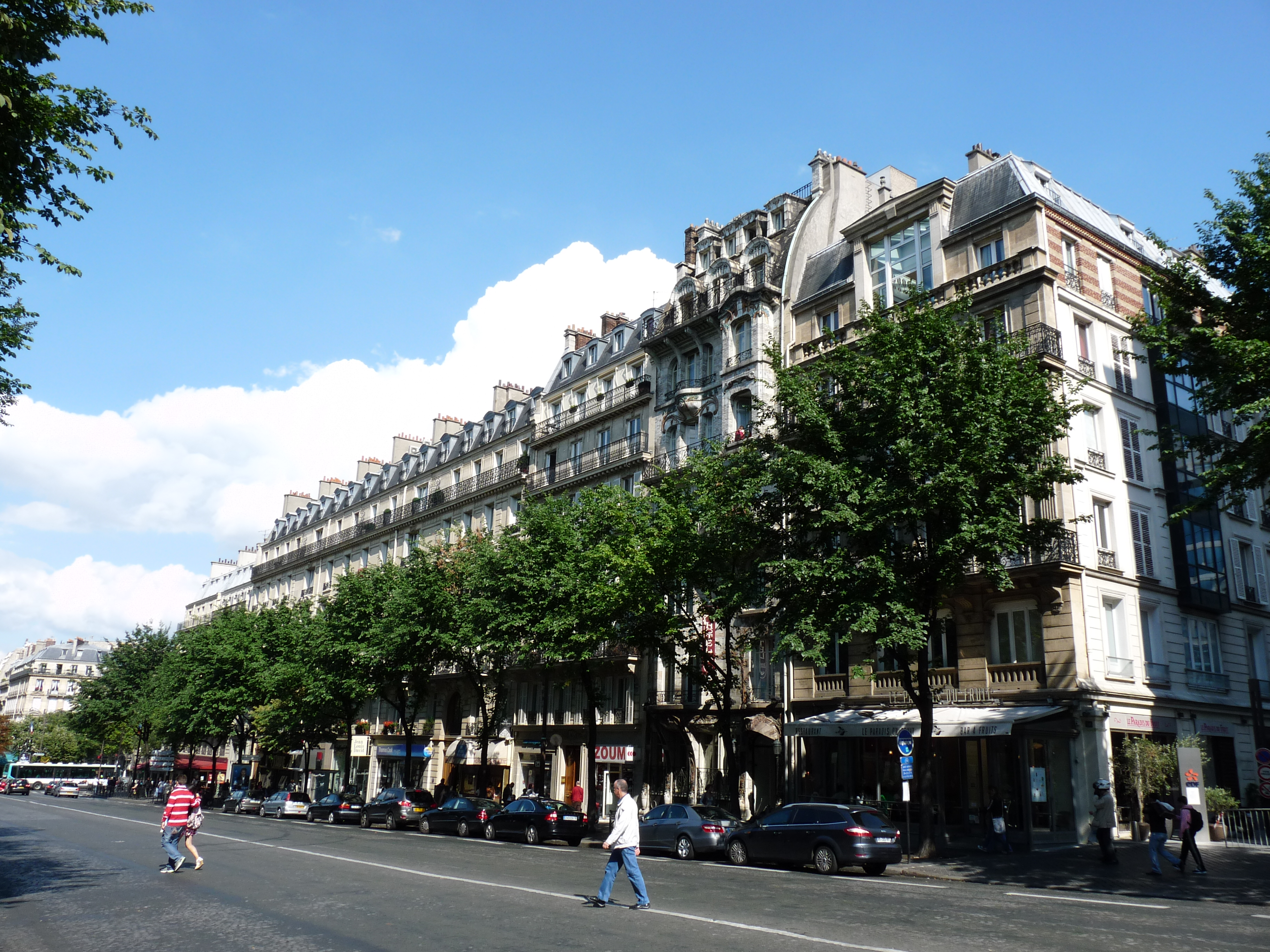
Avenue de Wagram near the Place des Ternes

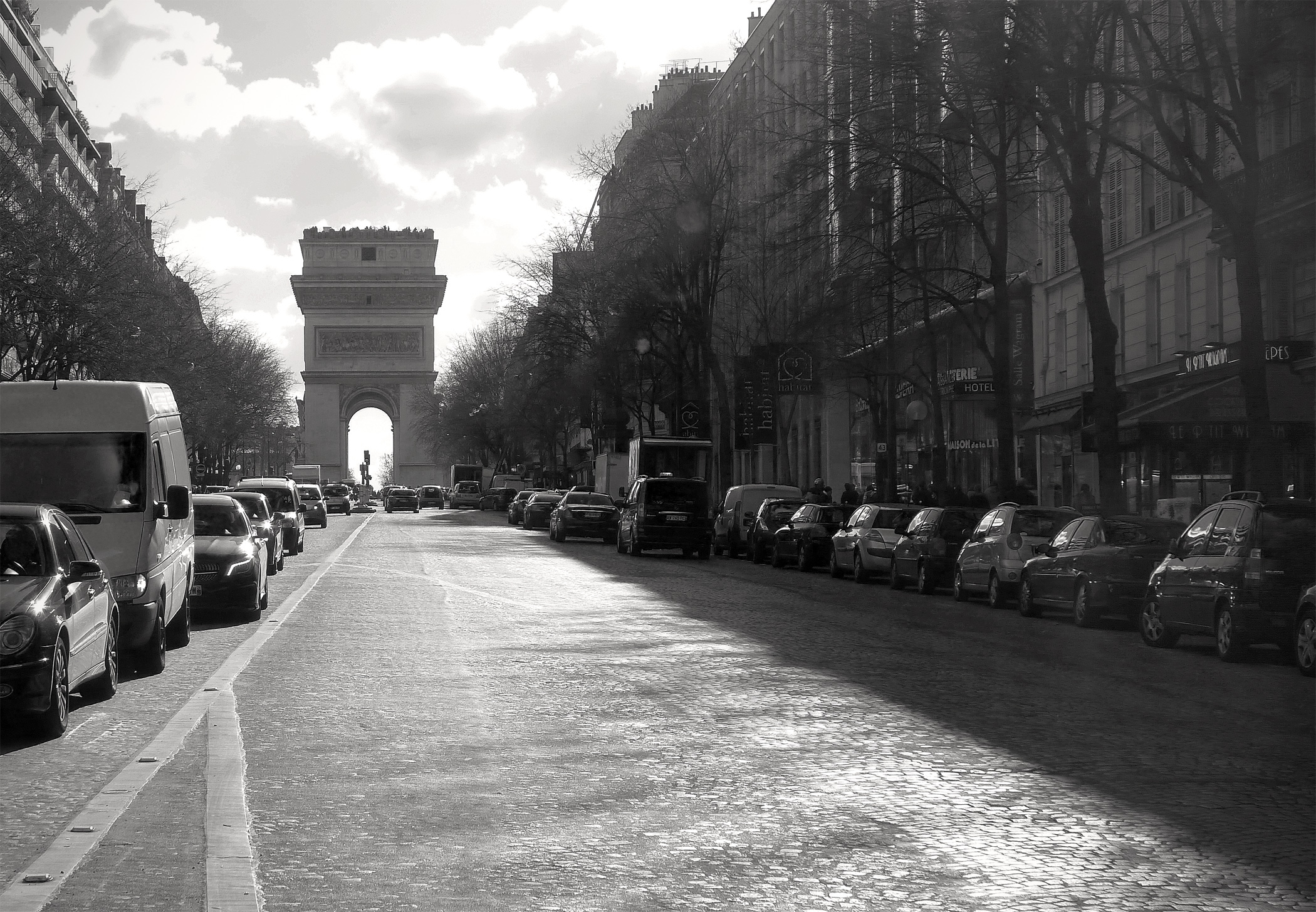
Avenue de Wagram with the Arc de Triomphe in the background
