= Hector Fabre =

French Canadian lawyer, journalist and diplomat

The Hon. Hector Fabre CMG
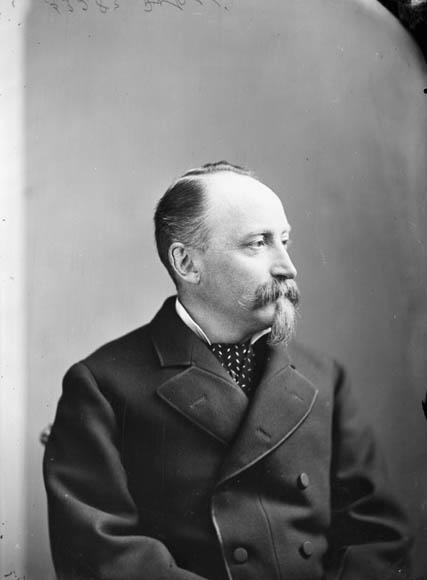
- Hector Fabre in 1879

Senator from La Salle, Quebec
- In office 1875–1882
- Appointed by: Alexander Mackenzie
- Preceded by: Charles-Eugène Panet
- Succeeded by: Pierre Antoine Deblois

Commissioner to France
- In office 1882–1910
- Preceded by: Established
- Succeeded by: Philippe Roy

Personal details
- Born: August 9, 1834 Montreal, Lower Canada
- Died: September 2, 1910 (aged 76) Paris, France
- Resting place: Boulogne-sur-Seine
- Party: Nationalist
- Relations: Édouard-Raymond Fabre, father

Louis-Roch-Hector Fabre, CMG (French pronunciation: [ɛktɔʁ fabʁ]; August 9, 1834 – September 2, 1910) was a French Canadian lawyer, journalist, diplomat, and senator.

He was appointed to the Senate of Canada on 5 February 1875 on the recommendation of Alexander Mackenzie. Sitting as a Nationalist, he represented the senatorial division of La Salle, Quebec until his resignation on 12 July 1882.

Following his resignation from the Senate, Fabre was appointed Canada's first General Agent in Paris, a position he would occupy until his death in 1910. This appointment marked one of the first diplomatic postings in Canadian history. In 1886, he was created a Companion of the Order of St Michael and St George.

The Fabres had one son, Paul Fabre (1867–1902), who accompanied his parents to Paris. He was appointed editorial secretary of the journal Paris-Canada in February 1892 and editor two years later. His health was poor, and he died in 1910 at the age of 70.
