= Philippe Roy =

Canadian politician

The Honourable Philippe Roy PC
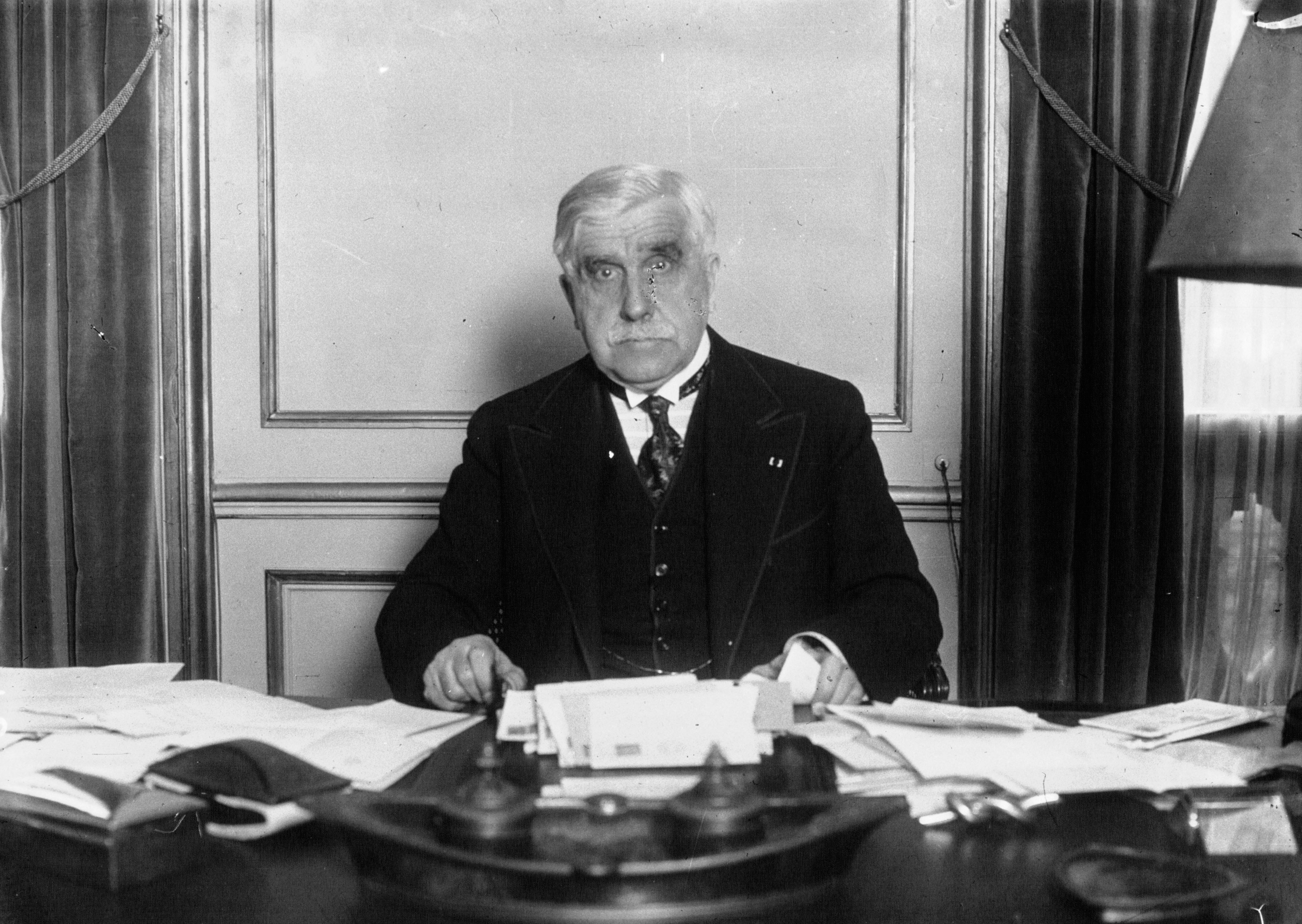

Canadian Senator from Alberta
- In office March 8, 1906 – April 21, 1911
- Appointed by: Wilfrid Laurier

Personal details
- Born: February 13, 1868 St-François, Quebec, Canada
- Died: December 10, 1948 (aged 80) Ottawa, Ontario, Canada
- Party: Liberal

Philippe Roy, PC (February 13, 1868 – December 10, 1948) was a Canadian physician, politician, and diplomat.

In 1906, he was appointed to the Senate of Canada representing the senatorial government division of Edmonton, Alberta. During this time he would and launch Le Courrier de l'Ouest a French language paper with future Alberta Senator Prosper-Edmond Lessard which reached a circulation of 8,000. A Liberal, he resigned in 1911. From 1911 to 1928, he was Canada's commissioner general in France. From 1928 to 1938, he was the first envoy extraordinary and minister plenipotentiary. He concurrently served as the government of Quebec's agent-general in Paris from 1911 until 1912 when the federal government required him to represent only it.

Diplomatic posts
Preceded by Hector Fabre	Agent General to France; 1891-1928	Succeeded by Post Abolished
Preceded by Established	Minister to France; 1928-1938	Succeeded by George Philias Vanier
