= Avenue Mac-Mahon =

Avenue in Paris, 17th arrondissement

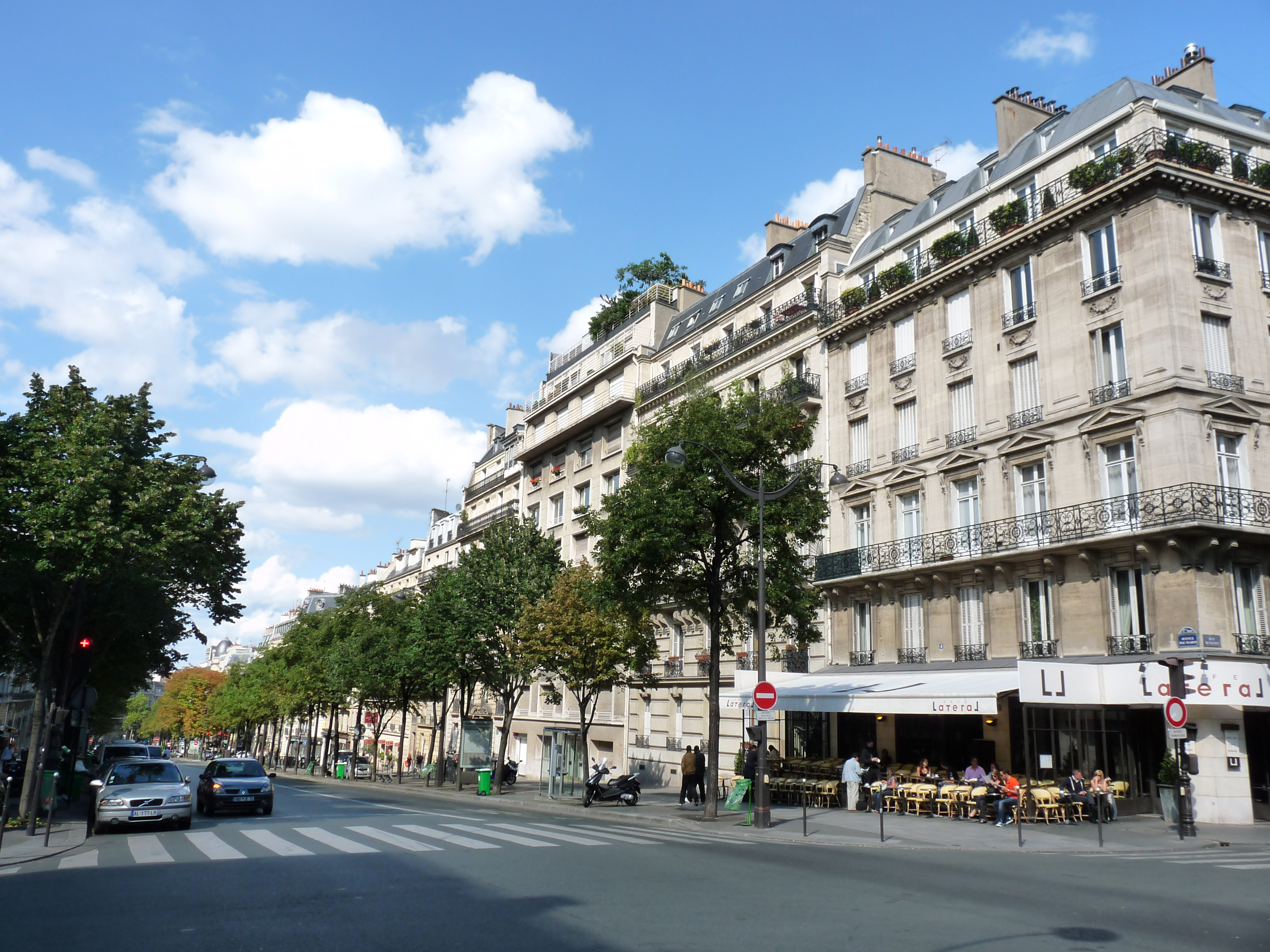
- View from the Rue de Tilsitt

- Location within Paris
- Former name: Avenue du Prince-Jérôme
- Length: 402 m (1,319 ft)
- Width: 36 m
- Arrondissement: 17th
- Quarter: Ternes
- Coordinates: 48°52′35″N 2°17′40″E

Construction
- Completed: 1854 and 1867

The Avenue Mac-Mahon is a street located in the 17th arrondissement of Paris. It extends from the Place Charles de Gaulle to the Avenue des Ternes, with a length of 402 meters and a width of 36 meters. Traffic flow is one-way, with two lanes directed towards the Place Charles de Gaulle. In the opposite direction, the street is designated for buses, taxis, and bicycles.

== Name origin ==
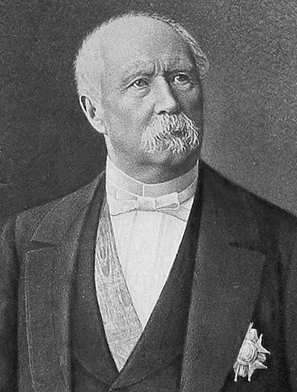
Marshal Mac Mahon

The Avenue Mac-Mahon is named in honor of Count Patrice de Mac Mahon (1808–1893), who held the titles of 1st Duke of Magenta and Marshal of the Second Empire. He also served as the President of the French Republic from 1873 to 1879.

The Mac Mahon family had Irish origins, having sought refuge in France with James II of England during the Glorious Revolution of 1689.

Patrice de Mac Mahon gained recognition for his actions during the Italian campaign of 1859. Notably, at a crucial point in the Battle of Magenta, he advanced his troops without explicit orders, a move that contributed to the French victory. In recognition of his service, Napoleon III awarded him the marshal's baton and bestowed upon him the title of Duke of Magenta.

== History ==
Originally named Avenue du Prince-Jérôme after Napoleon I's youngest brother, (Note: Jérôme is the youngest of Madame Mère's eleven children, fifteen years younger than his eldest, the Emperor. Enlisted in the navy, he married a New Yorker while still a minor. This marriage was broken off by the Emperor, who had him marry the daughter of Frederick I of Württemberg. He was then made King of Westphalia. He had to leave his kingdom after the disasters of 1813. When his uncle Napoleon III came to power, he was appointed President of the Senate (1851) and reinstated with the title and honors of Prince Imperial (1852). Celebrated as the emperor's brother and Napoleon III's uncle, he was buried alongside his older brother at Les Invalides in 1860.) the avenue was later renamed Avenue Mac-Mahon in 1875.

The development of the avenue occurred in two phases:

- 1854: (Note: Under the decree of August 13, 1854, between the Étoile traffic circle and rue de Tilsitt.) Construction of symmetrical buildings from the Rue de Tilsitt towards the periphery of the Place Charles de Gaulle;
- 1867: (Note: Under the decree of August 13, 1854, between the Rue de Tilsitt and the Avenue des Ternes.) Development of the section between the Rue de Tilsitt and the Avenue des Ternes. This phase incorporated a portion of the Rue de l'Arc-de-Triomphe and its extension, which now forms part of the Avenue Niel.

== Remarkable buildings and places of memory ==
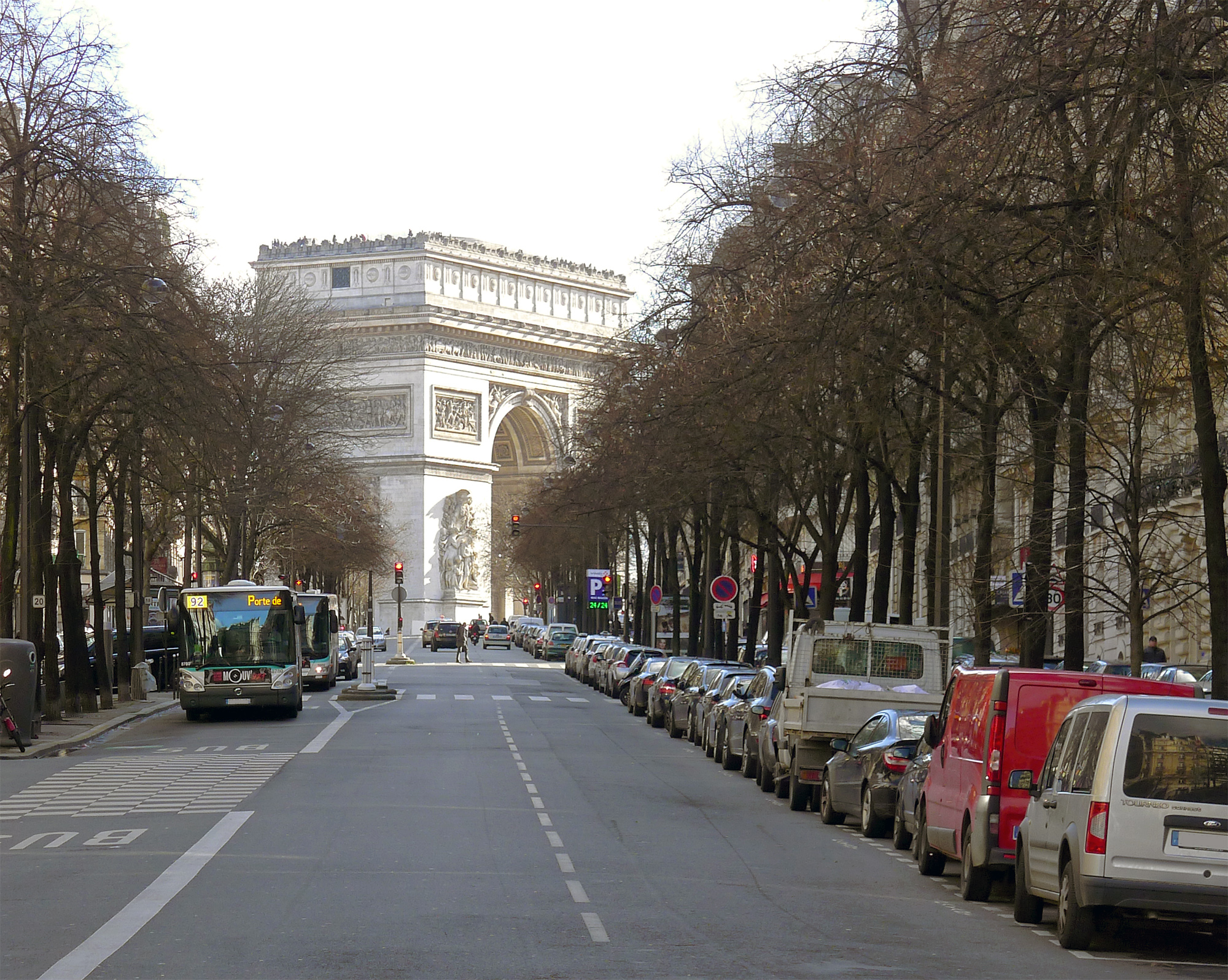
The avenue looking towards the Arc de Triomphe

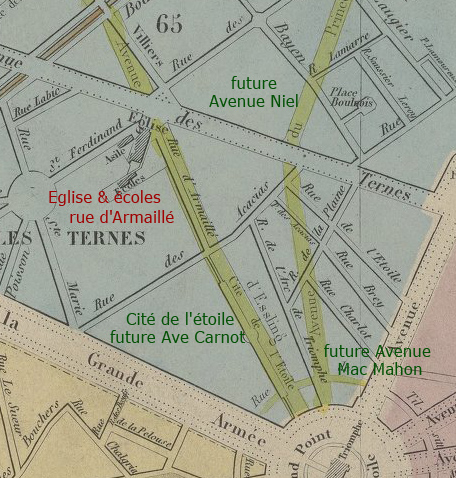
Project for the Avenue du Prince-Jérôme on the Goujon plan of 1866

- N° 5: The Mac Mahon cinema, established in 1938, remains a significant venue for cinephiles in Paris. It features repertory films and hosts previews, discussions, and Q&A sessions throughout the week.
- N° 6b: In 1965, Emanuel Ungaro, with the assistance of Swiss artist Sonja Knapp and four employees, opened his couture house in a 40 m² space at this address. His first ready-to-wear collection, "Parallèle", was presented in 1968.
- N° 12b (corner of the Rue Troyon): In 1935, Édith Piaf, then a young street performer known as the chanteuse du bitume ("street singer"), was discovered at this location by Louis Leplée, the manager of the upscale cabaret Le Gerny's.
- N° 13: This address was the residence of poet Jean Rameau (1858–1942), known for his eclogues and songs and who performed for patrons of the Le Chat Noir cabaret. Painter Léonard Sarluis (1874–1949) also lived here.
- N° 17: Actor Paul Azaïs (1902–1974) resided at this location in 1943, coinciding with his second marriage.
- N° 18b: This address features a chalet located 100 meters from the Place de l'Étoile. Le Bat Petite Enfance, a nursery school, was constructed here in 1897 by architect F. Constant Bernard, and its exterior remains unchanged. It is also noted that the zouave Jacob reportedly practiced healing at this location.
- N° 22b: on October 8, 1943, Cesare Luccarini, identified as an FTP-MOI member associated with l'Affiche Rouge, threw a grenade into a restaurant frequented by occupying forces; the device failed to detonate.
- N° 29: This neo-Moorish-style building features bossages and semicircular arched windows. It was designed by architect Georges Massa and constructed in 1902 for Dr. Francisco Henríquez de Zubiría. (Note: Francisco Henríquez de Zubiría (1869–1933), born in Paris, was a Colombian citizen until he became a French citizen in 1917. He studied medicine, was attached to the Colombian embassy in Paris and in 1898 married the adopted daughter of a millionaire, Lino Martinez. A sportsman, he was an Olympic medalist at the 1900 Olympic Games in tug-of-war. He served as a doctor in the French army during the World War I and was awarded the Légion d'honneur order of merit."EXCLUSIVA: un Colombiano olímpico en París 1900" [EXCLUSIVE: a Colombian Olympian in Paris 1900]. Olimpismo.) Initially two storeys, an additional three storeys were added in 1903. The building's design was published in the architectural magazine Monographies de Bâtiments Modernes. In 1906, the building served as the headquarters for the Modern-Club, an artistic, literary, and sports association with the stated goal "to assist in the development of the arts in general and, in particular, to facilitate the beginnings of young authors and artists". In 1907, law enforcement raided the club premises during gambling activities, seizing 3,400 francs in stakes and 4,000 francs in chips. The president of the Modern-Club and six employees were subsequently prosecuted on charges related to operating a game of chance. By 1913, the building housed the Mac Mahon Palace Hotel. That year, the hotel advertised a New Year's Eve event for 500 guests featuring "first-rate attractions, tango, Argentine orchestra". In 1920, the hotel organized daily tea dances and bi-weekly formal gala evenings, with a director noted as being a ballet master from the Opéra. The hotel's name was changed to Hotel Ermitage-Mac-Mahon in 1935. In 1936, an altercation between waiters at the hotel resulted in the death of one individual. Since 2019, the former hotel building, which covers approximately 3,000 m² across seven levels and includes an interior terrace and a tree-lined atrium, has been occupied by a notary's office.
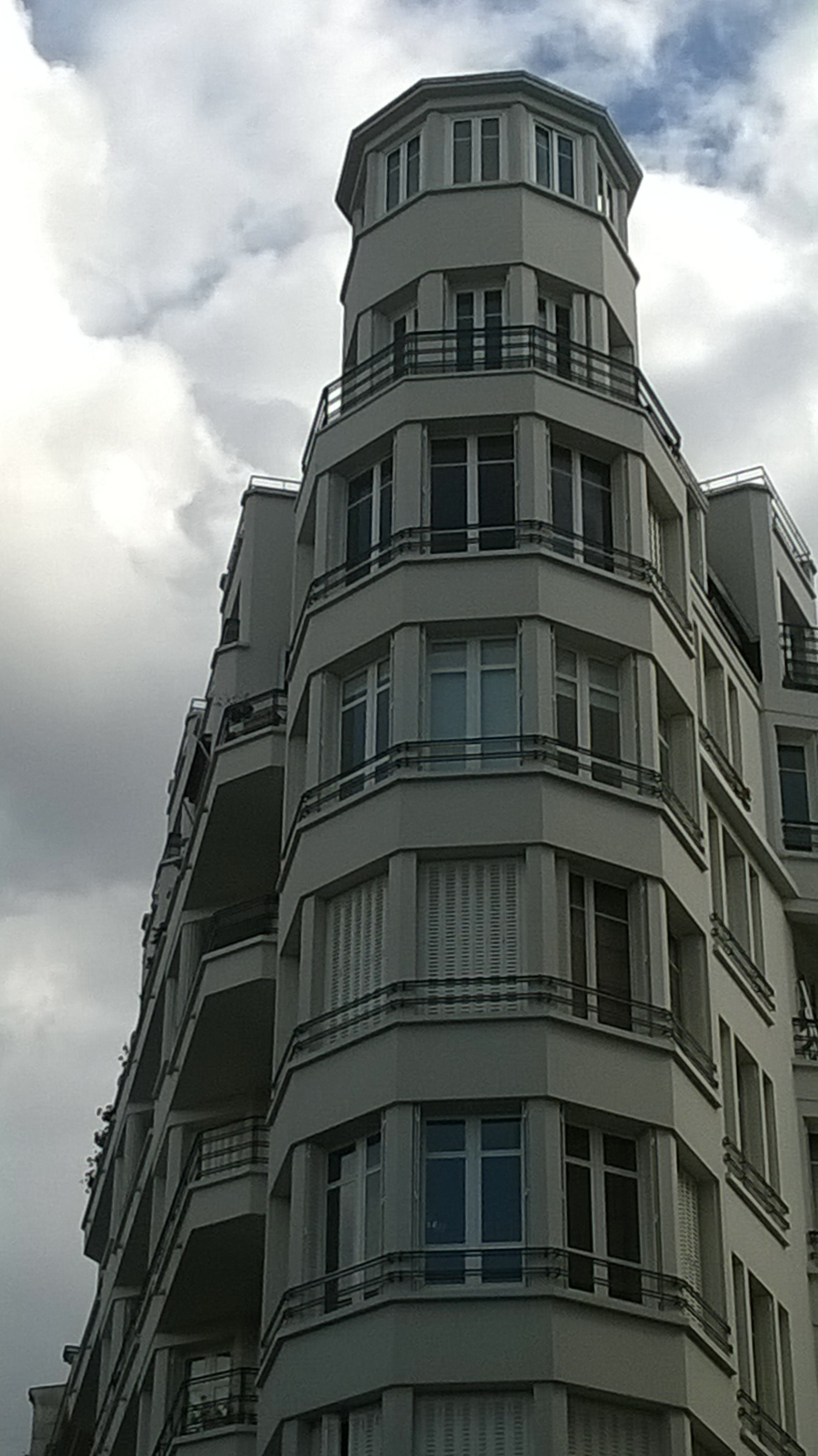
N° 17: 1930 building

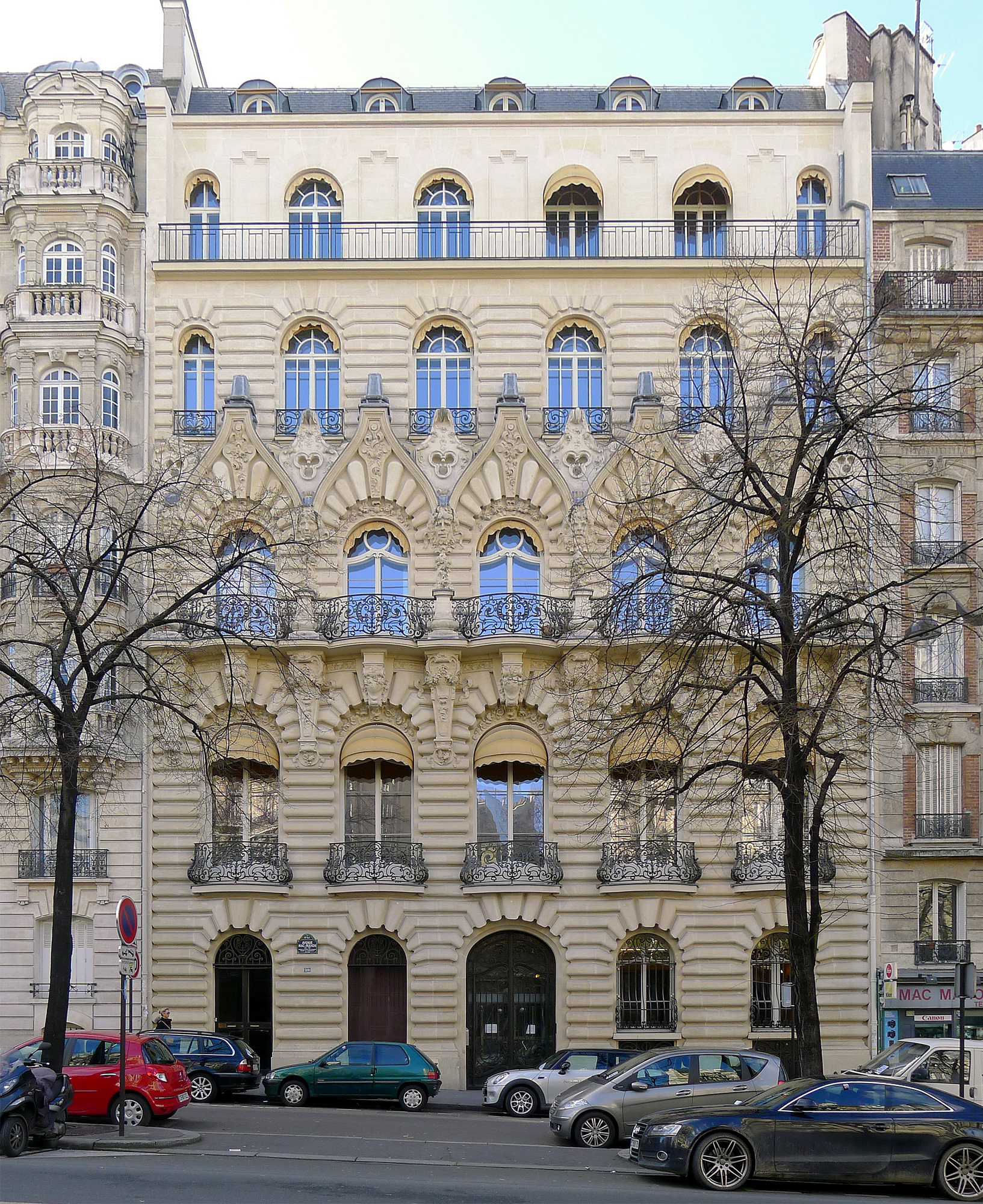
N° 29: built by George Massa (1902)

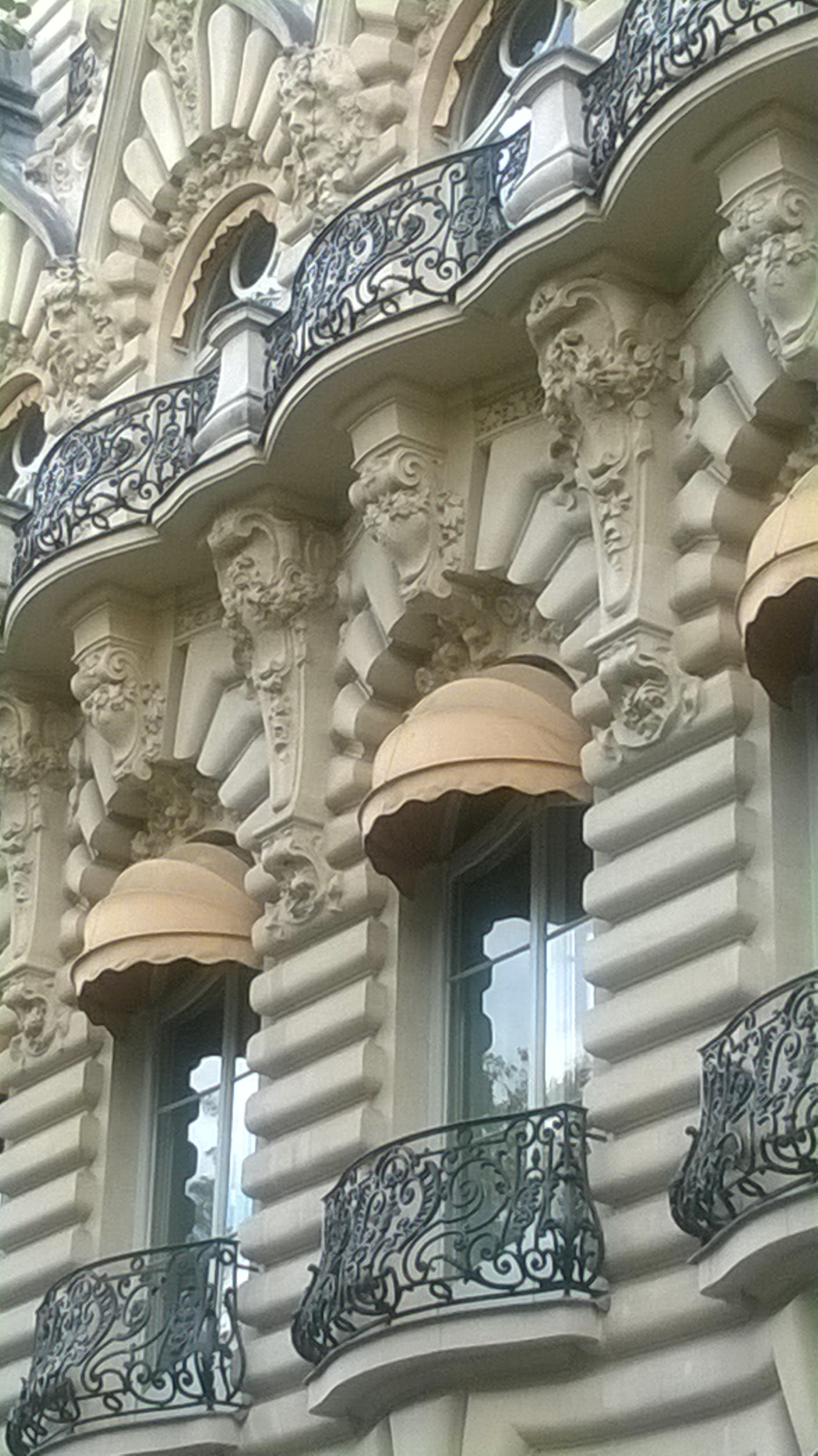
Detail of the façade at n° 29

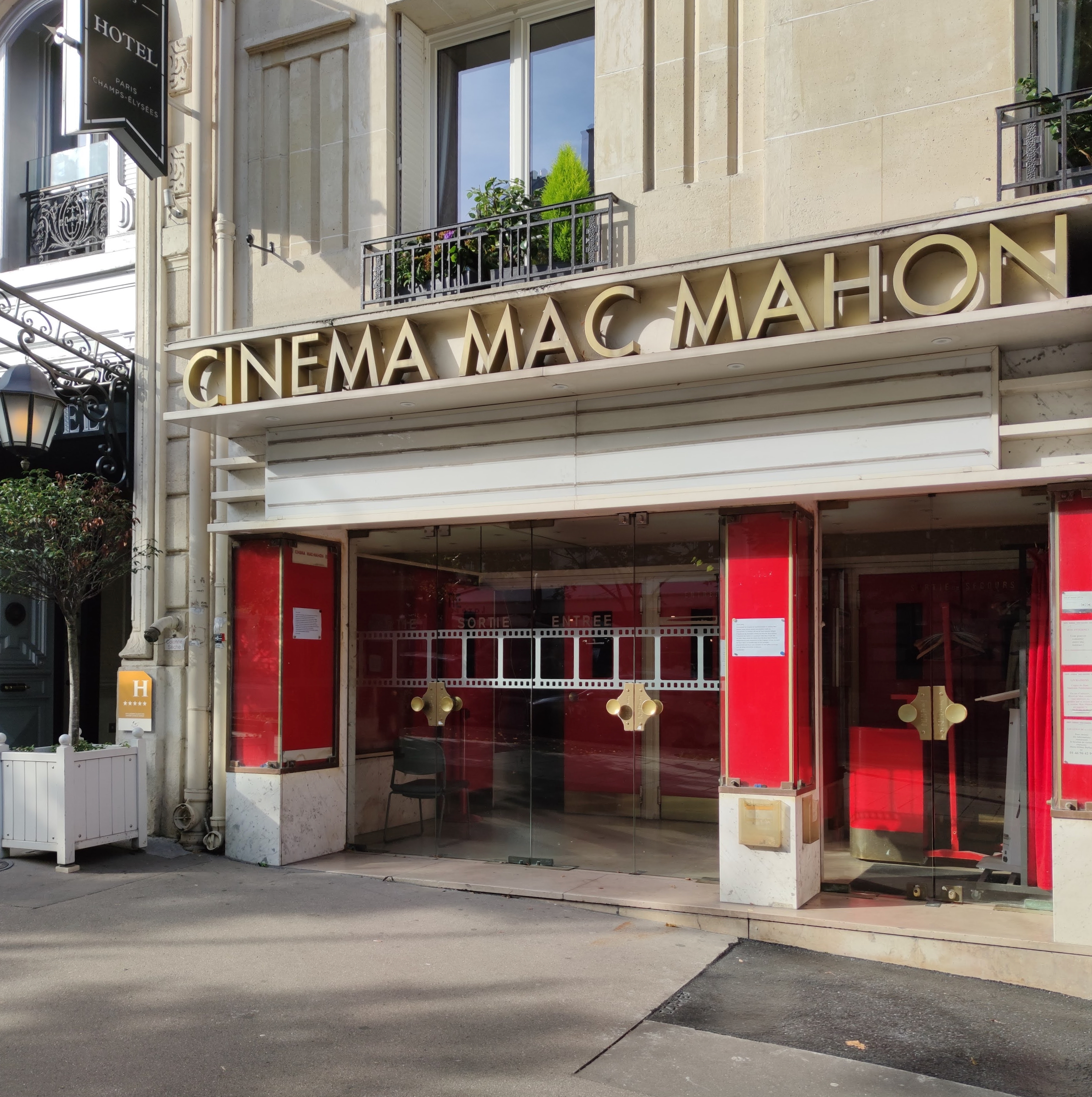
N° 5: Mac Mahon cinéma
- N° 33: Located on the corner of the Passage des Acacias, this building is described as a former mansion featuring a marquise and decorative protruding poodle and bulldog heads in its architecture. During the early 1900s, this address served as a district office for the Comptoir National d'Escompte de Paris. In 1913, a hotel operating at this location, with a reported surface area of approximately 115 m², was put up for sale with an initial bid set at 100,000 francs.
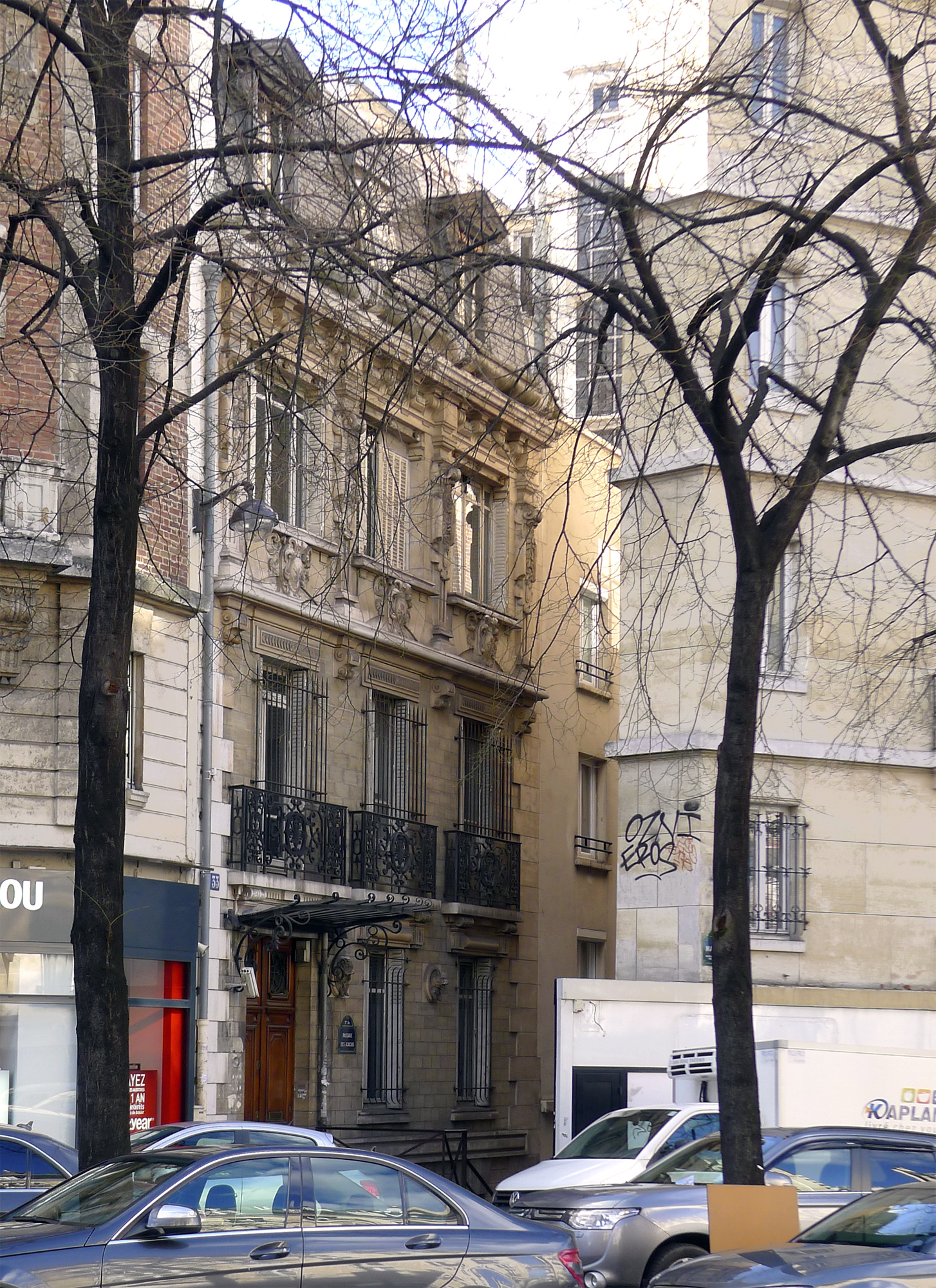
Passage des Acacias seen from the avenue

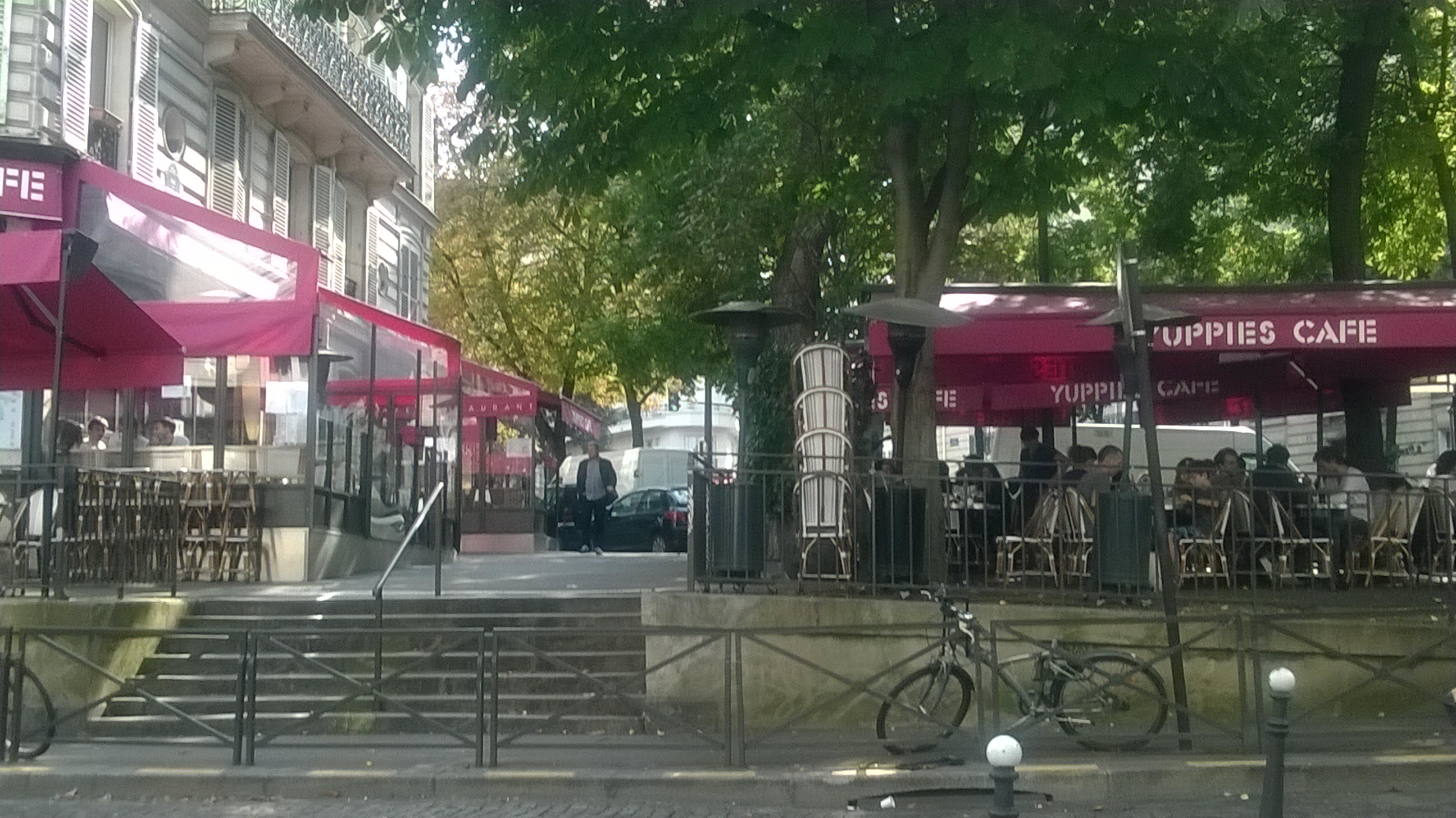
Placette at the corner of the Rue Brey

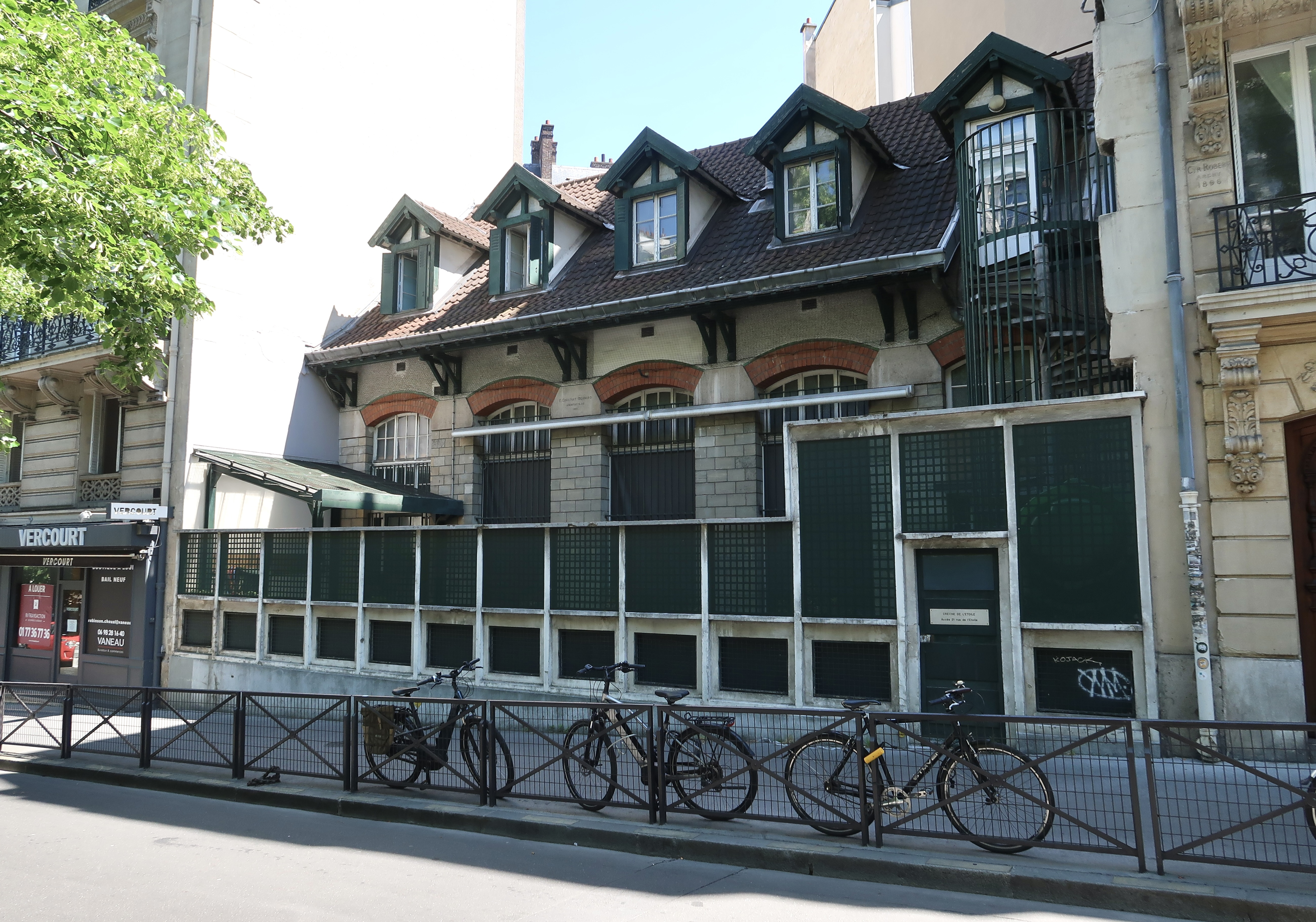
The chalet-crèche

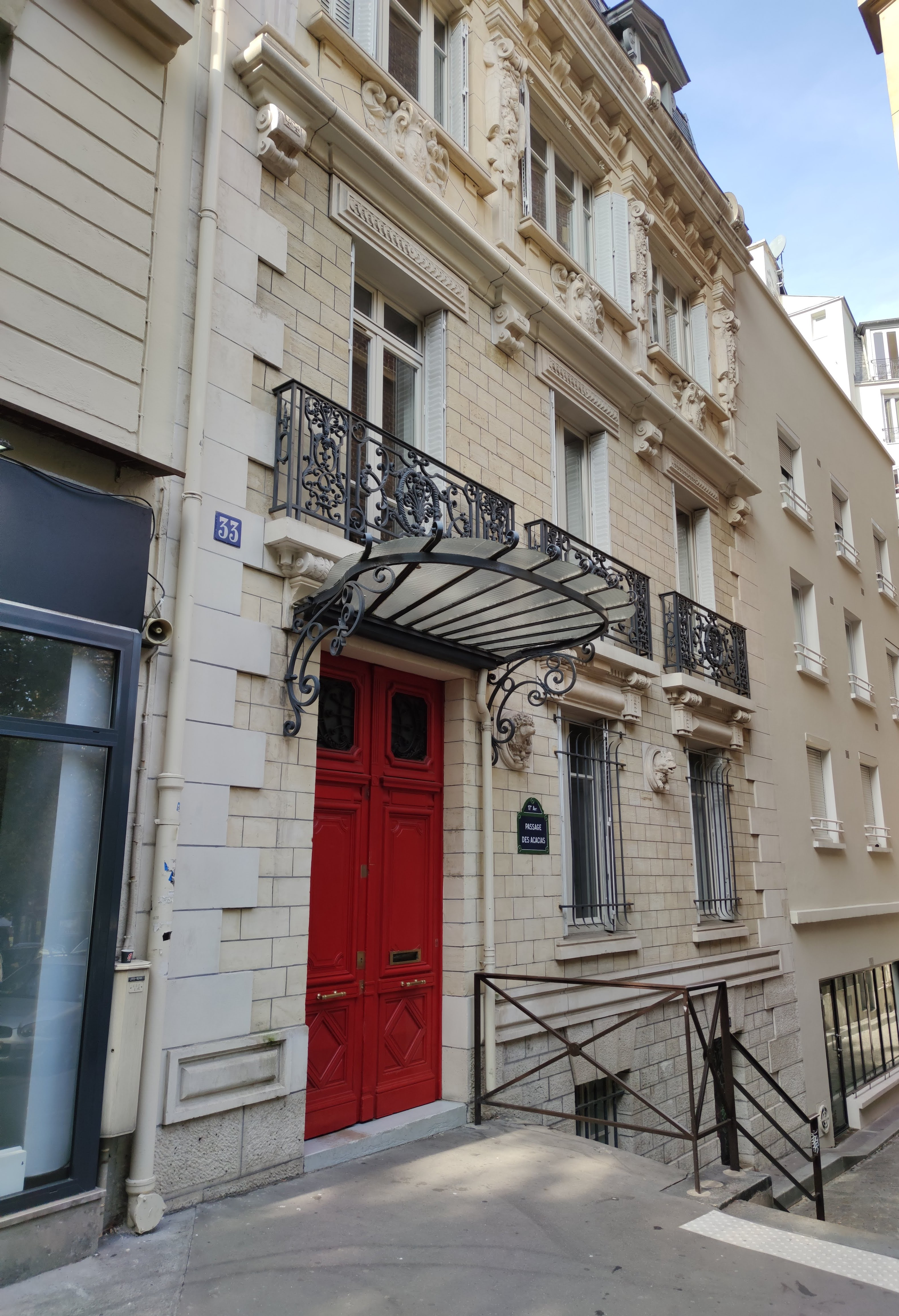
N° 33: corner of the Passage des Acacias
