= Matignon =

Matignon may refer to:

- Hôtel Matignon in Paris, France, the official residence of the French Prime Minister
- Matignon, Côtes-d'Armor, a commune of the Côtes-d'Armor département in France
- Matignon High School, a Catholic school in Cambridge, Massachusetts, USA
- Matignon (cuisine), a mirepoix in which the ingredients are minced rather than diced and more flavourings added
- Matignon (surname), a French surname
- Matignon Accords (1936)
- Matignon Agreements (1988)

== See also ==
- Matignon Agreements (disambiguation)
