= Avenue Pierre Ier de Serbie =

Parisian avenue named after Peter I of Serbia

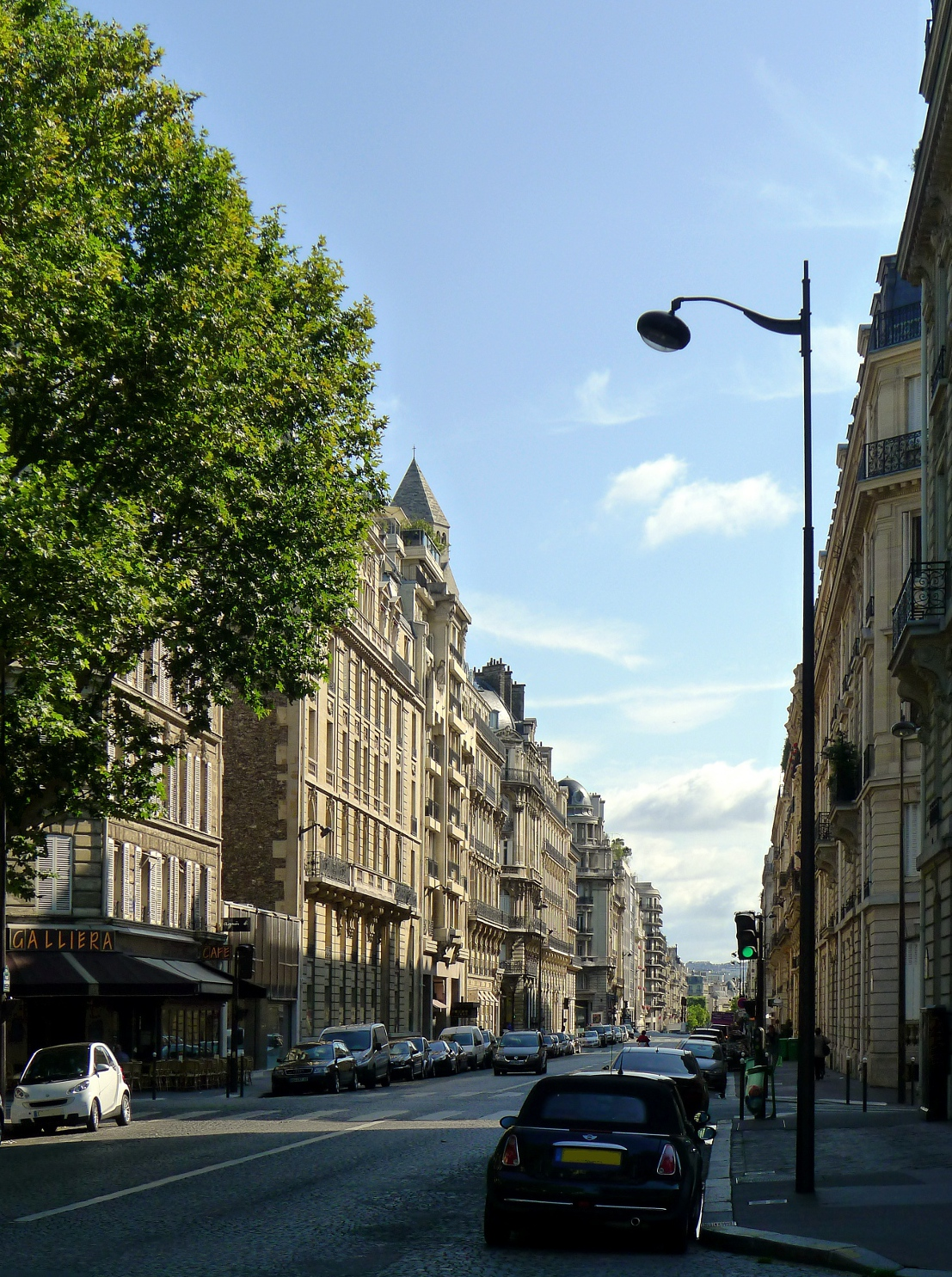
- Avenue Pierre Ier de Serbie looking towards the Avenue Marceau

- Location within Paris
- Length: 565 m (1,854 ft)
- Width: 20 m (66 ft)
- Arrondissement: 8th, 16th
- Quarter: Élysées, Chaillot
- Coordinates: 48°51′59″N 2°17′49″E
- From: Place d'Iéna
- To: 27 Avenue George V

Construction
- Completion: 17 September 1864
- Denomination: 14 July 1918

The Avenue Pierre Ier de Serbie (French pronunciation: [avny pjɛʁ pʁəmjɛʁ də sɛʁbi]) is an avenue which runs through the 16th arrondissement of Paris, France, from the Place d'Iena to 27 avenue George V.

== History ==
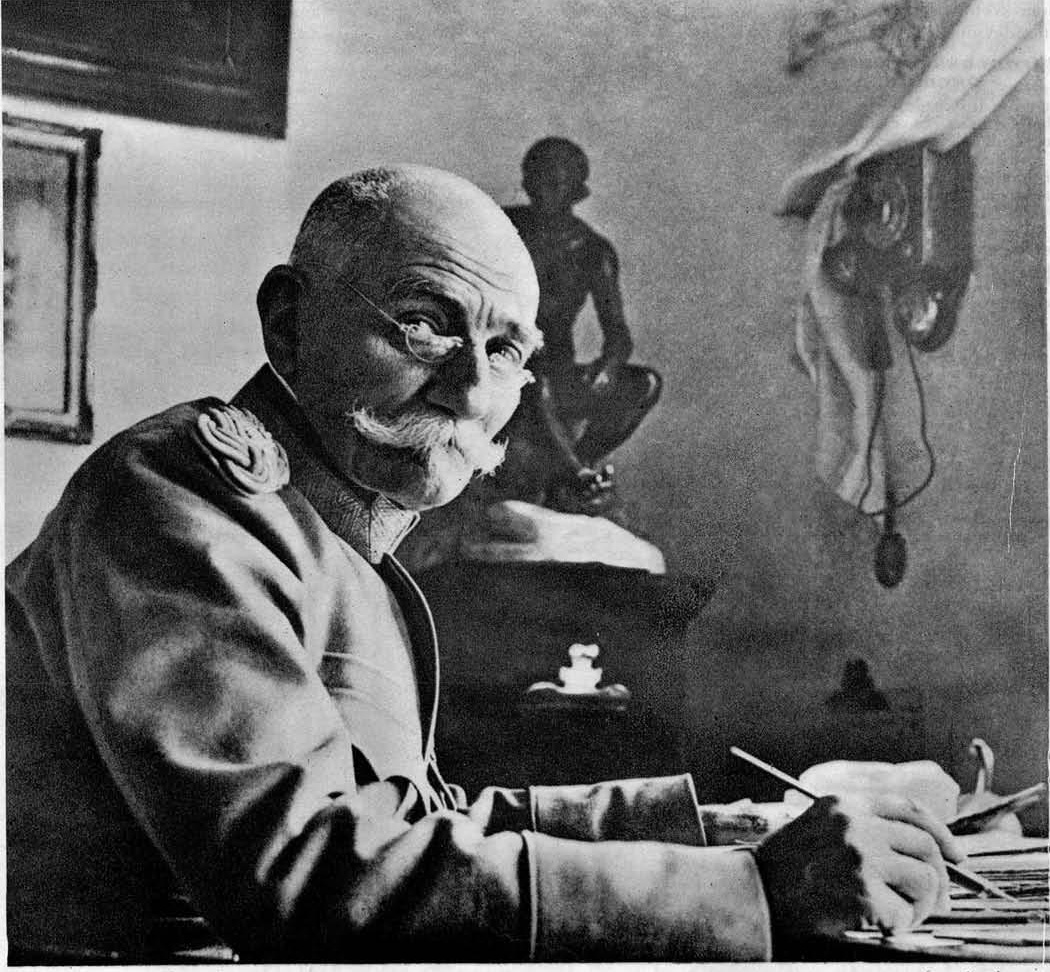
Peter I of Serbia

The Avenue Pierre Ier de Serbie was previously part of the Rue Pierre Charron, and before that a segment of the Rue de Morny (today part of Pierre Charron).

The avenue was officially created on 14 July 1918. It was named in honour of Peter I of Serbia (1846–1921), last king of Serbia and first king of Yugoslavia, who volunteered to serve in the French Army, the French Foreign Legion, and was decorated with the French Legion of Honour.

== Notable buildings ==
- No. 10: Palais Galliera - Musée de la Mode de la Ville de Paris
- No. 22: Les Films du Losange - Film company created by Barbet Schroeder and Eric Rohmer
- No. 31: CGPF (1937–1940); CNPF (1950–1998); MEDEF (1998–2003)

== Closest transport ==
- Métro - Iéna
- RER - Pont de l'Alma
- Bus - 32, 42, 63, 72, 80, 82, 92

== Notable residents ==
- Mary Cassatt lived there in 1884.
