= CGPF =

CGPF may refer to:

- Confédération générale de la production française, a French employer' association from 1919 to 1936
- Confédération générale du patronat français, a French employer' association from 1936 to 1940
