= Avenue Hoche =

Avenue in Paris, France

Coordinates: 48.8761°N 2.3006°E

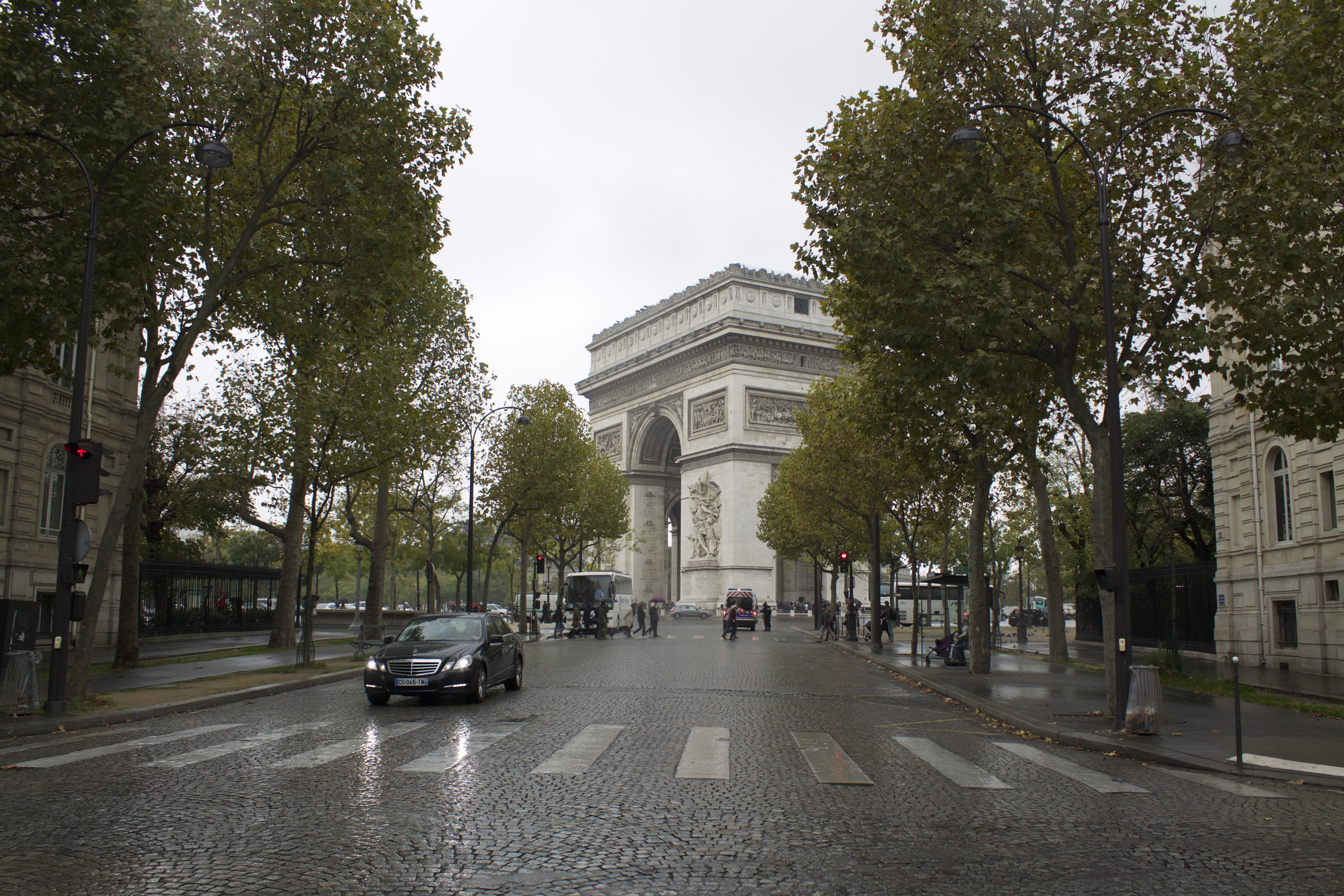
Avenue Hoche looking toward the Arc de Triomphe

The Avenue Hoche (French pronunciation: [avny ɔʃ]) is an avenue in the 8th arrondissement of Paris, France.

== Location ==
The avenue runs the intersection at 67, Rue de Courcelles and the Place du Général-Brocard all the way to the Place Charles de Gaulle and its Arc de Triomphe, in the 8th arrondissement of Paris.

== History ==
Originally named the Boulevard de Monceau, the Avenue Hoche was first opened in 1854 between the Rue de Tilsitt and the Place de l'Etoile. Three years later, it was extended from the Rue de Tilsitt to the Rue de Courcelles. It was later renamed in honour of General Lazare Hoche.

French royalist and general Athanase-Charles-Marie Charette de la Contrie lived there after the royal family was removed from the Palace of Versailles.
