= Rue Pierre Charron, Paris =

Street in Paris, France

Rue Pierre-Charron
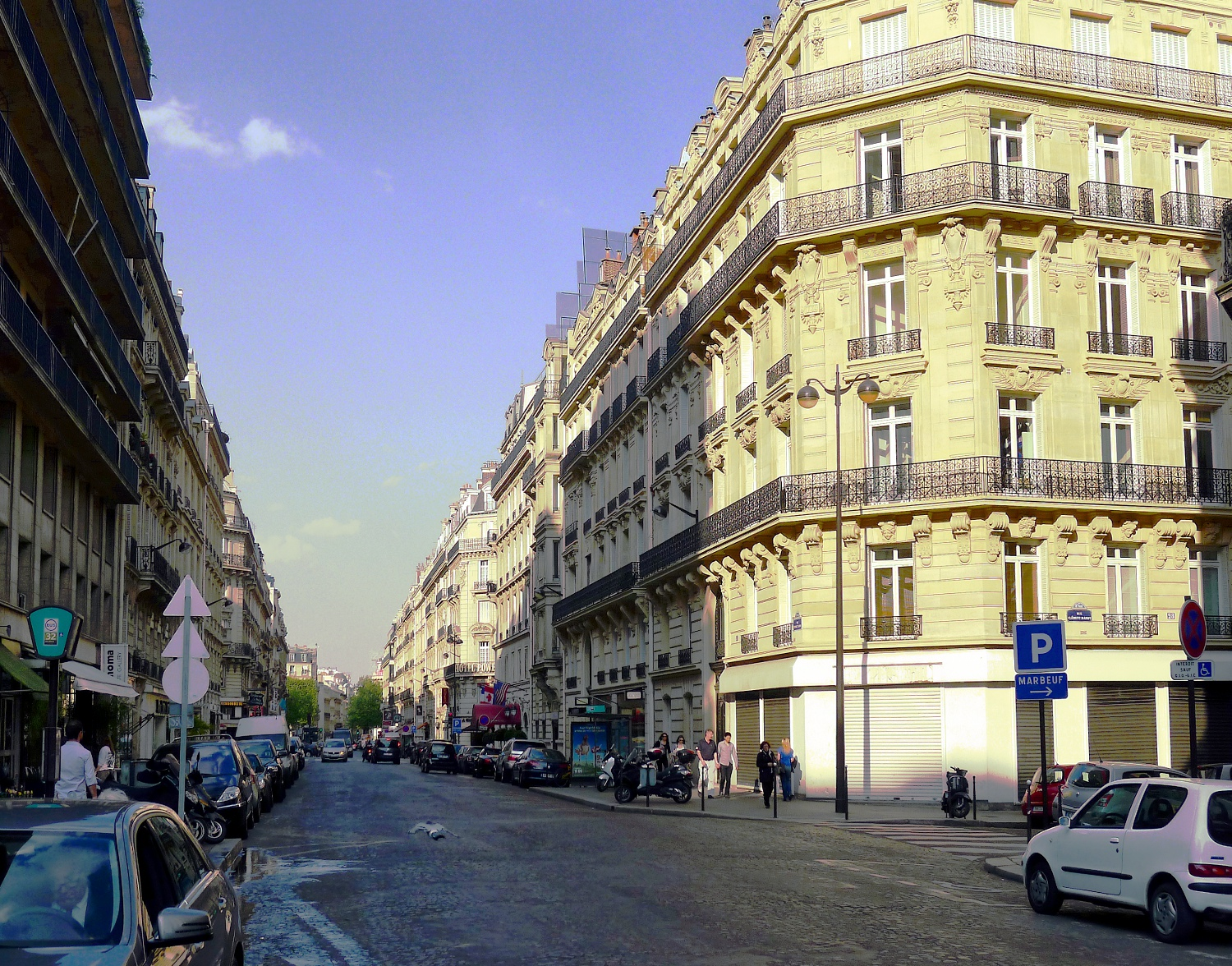
- Rue Pierre-Charron as seen from the Avenue George V, April 2011

- Location within Paris
- Length: 320 m (1,050 ft)
- Width: 20 m (66 ft)
- Arrondissement: 8th
- Quarter: Champs-Elysées
- Coordinates: 48°52′10″N 2°18′12″E
- From: 30 avenue George V
- To: 55 Champs-Elysées

Construction
- Completion: 1804
- Denomination: October 25, 1879

The Rue Pierre Charron (French pronunciation: [ʁy pjɛʁ ʃaʁɔ̃]) is a street in the 8th arrondissement of Paris, near the Avenue Montaigne high-fashion district.

== History ==
This street was once part of a single Rue de Morny that extended until the Place d'Iéna. Already with its present name, its section between the Avenue George V and the abovementioned place was renamed the Avenue Pierre Ier de Serbie in 1918.

Le Gerny's is the name of a former Parisian nightclub located at 54 rue Pierre-Charron. The nightclub is now mostly known as the venue where Edith Piaf made her professional debut, after its owner and director Louis Leplee spotted her singing on a Paris street, and promoted her giving her the nickname la môme Piaf ("The Little Sparrow") in October 1935, when performing at his club.

No. 49 was the Hôtel de M. de Lapisse and was used as the Headquarters of American General John Pershing during the First World War, then became a veterans' club of the American Legion as the Pershing Hall Hotel.

No. 46 was the Embassy of Estonia in France from 1998 to 2005.

== Origin of the name ==
Pierre Charron (1541–1603) was a French philosopher, author of Traité de la Sagesse (Treatise on Wisdom), and a friend of fellow philosopher Montaigne after whom the nearby Avenue Montaigne is named.

== Closest Métro station ==
The Rue Pierre Charron empties into the Avenue des Champs-Elysées about midway between métro line 1 stations George V and Franklin D. Roosevelt. Also nearby are metro line 9's Saint-Philippe du Roule (to the north) and Alma-Marceau (to the south).

== In popular culture ==
Mentioned in French singer/songwriter Renaud's "Les Charognards."
