= Claude-Joseph Gignoux =

French politician

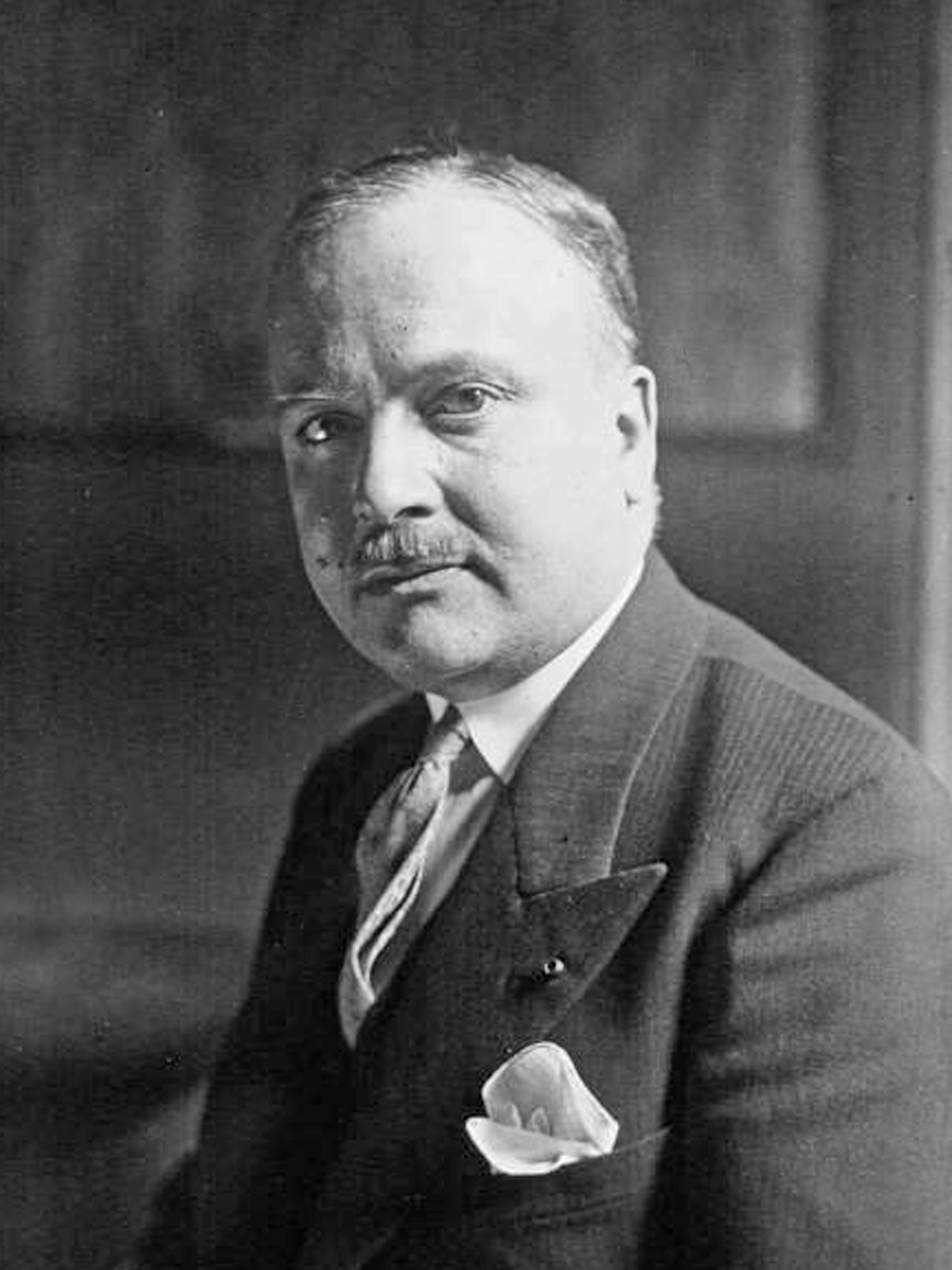
- Born: 29 November 1890; Lyon, France
- Died: 17 April 1968 (aged 77); Paris, France
- Occupation: Politician

Claude-Joseph Gignoux (1890–1968) was a French politician. He served as a member of the Chamber of Deputies from 1928 to 1932, representing Loire. Gignoux became an undersecretary of state. In 1936 he was director of the Journée Industrielle.

On 9 October 1936 the Confédération générale du patronat français (CGPF) held a general assembly to elect its new board. Gignoux was elected president. He proved an energetic leader. He said that employers must not try to avoid their responsibilities, but must confirm their authority through united action. In the early part of 1939 Gigoux warned the CGPF members of the danger of government demands to rehire workers who had been fired after the general strike, since this would only lead to further government intervention. He urged industrialists to make the present arrangement work, since socialism was the only alternative.

In November 1941, Gignoux was made a member of the National Council of Vichy France.

== Honors and awards ==
Commander of the Order of Legion of Honour

== Sources ==
- Imlay, Talbot C. (2003), Facing the Second World War: Strategy, Politics, and Economics in Britain and France, 1938-1940, Oxford University Press, ISBN 978-0-19-926122-2
- "L'Oligarchie Economique", Les Documents Politiques, Diplomatiques et Financiers (in French), Paris, October 1936
- Vinen, Richard (2002-08-08), The Politics of French Business 1936-1945, Cambridge University Press, ISBN 978-0-521-52240-3
