= Rue de Presbourg =

Street in Paris, France

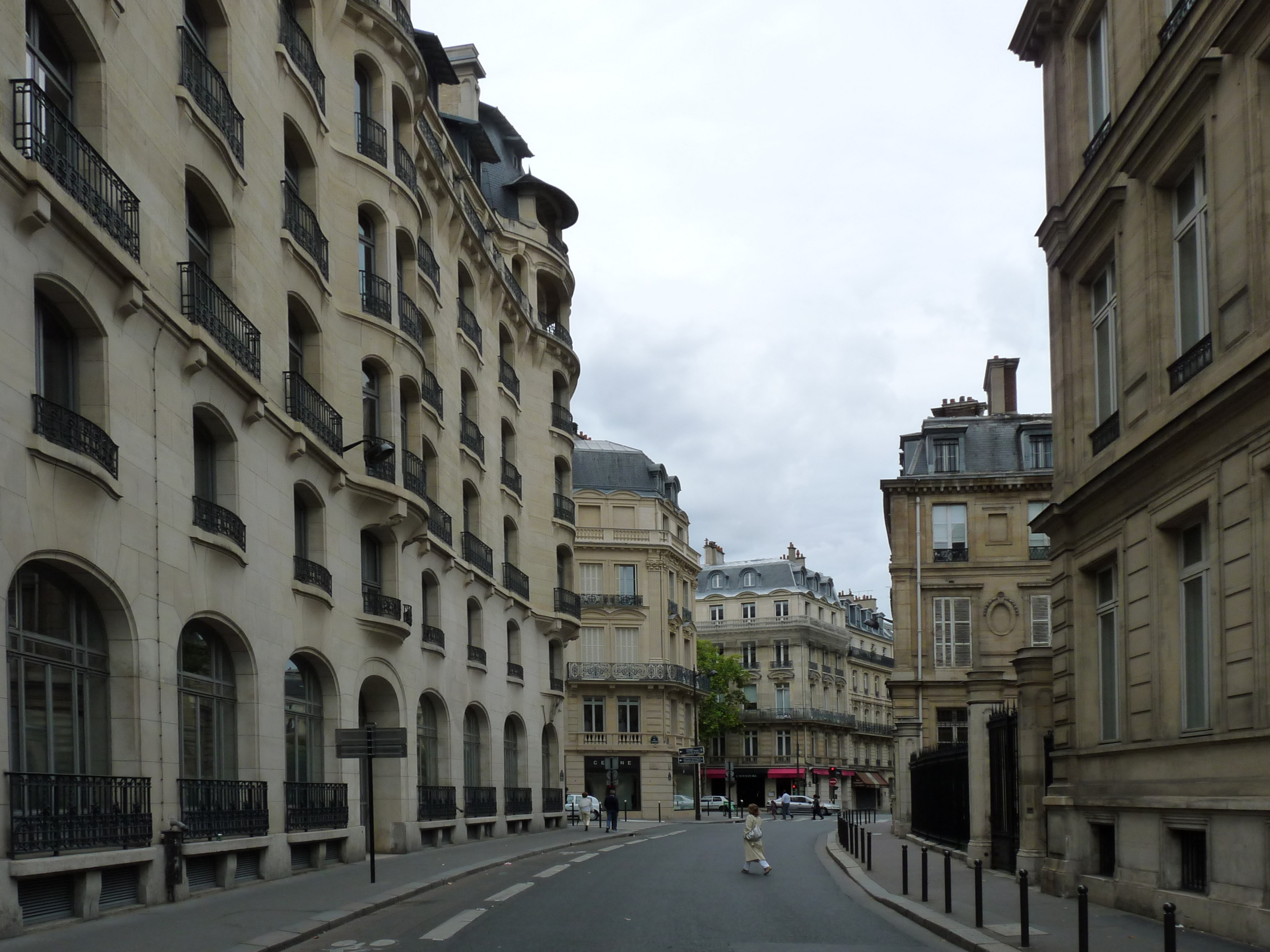
- Rue de Presbourg, view from the Avenue Kléber, August 2010
- Location: Paris
- Coordinates: 48°52′20″N 2°17′41″E

Construction
- Commissioned: 1864

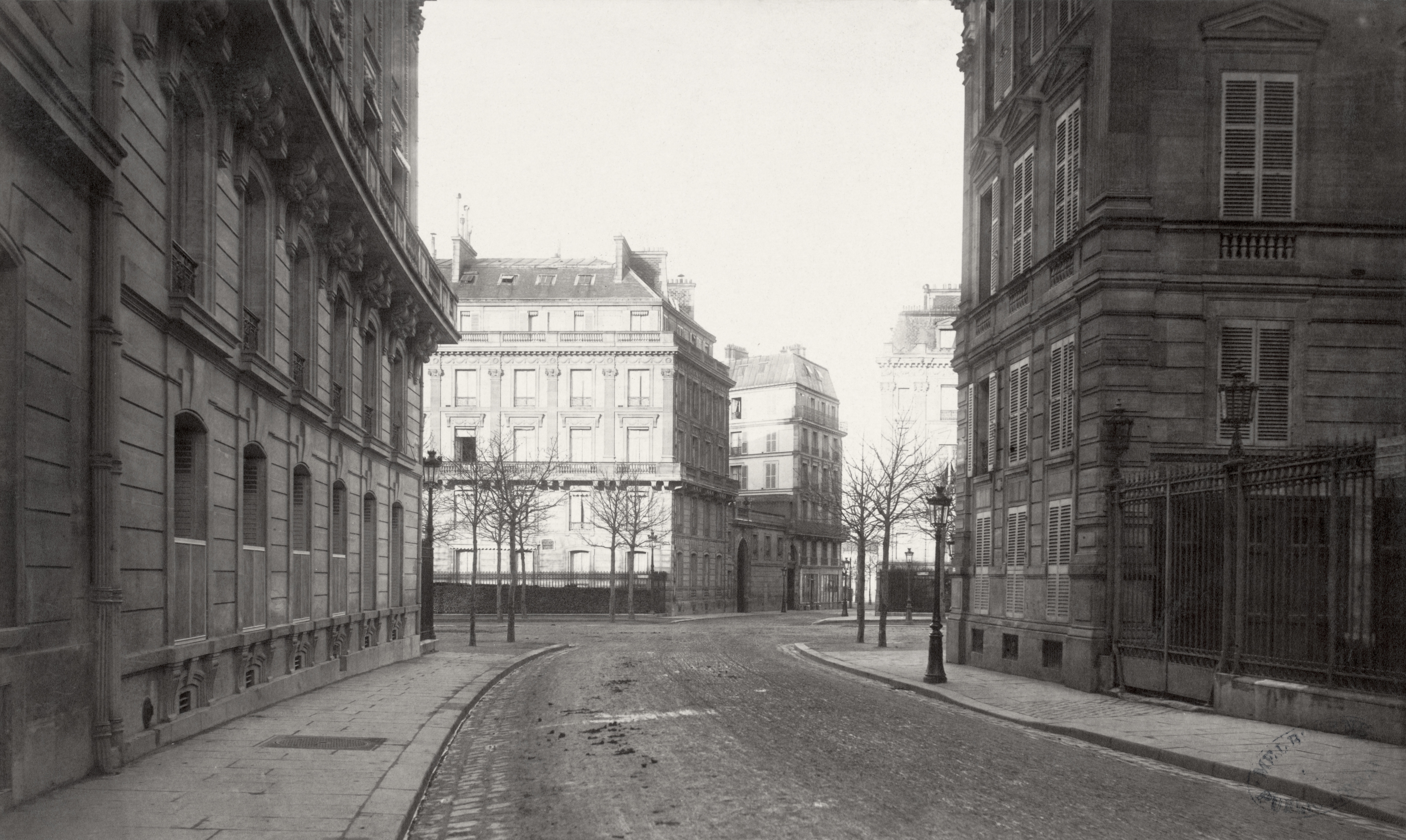
Rue de Presbourg, around 1853-1870

The Rue de Presbourg is a street in the 8th and 16th arrondissement of Paris, France. Since 1864, it has been named after Napoleon's 1805 diplomatic success at the Peace of Pressburg and, with the Rue de Tilsitt (named after another such success in 1807), it forms a circle around the Place Charles de Gaulle.
