= Matignon Agreements =

Matignon Accords or Matignon Agreements may refer to:

- Matignon Agreements (1936), an agreement between the French government, employers and labour guaranteeing trade union membership and negotiating rights, a 40-hour working week and paid workers' holidays
- Matignon Agreements (1988), an agreement for increased New Caledonian territorial autonomy between the French government, Kanak independence activists and French settlers

== See also ==
- Matignon (disambiguation)
