= Place Charles de Gaulle =

Public square in Paris, France

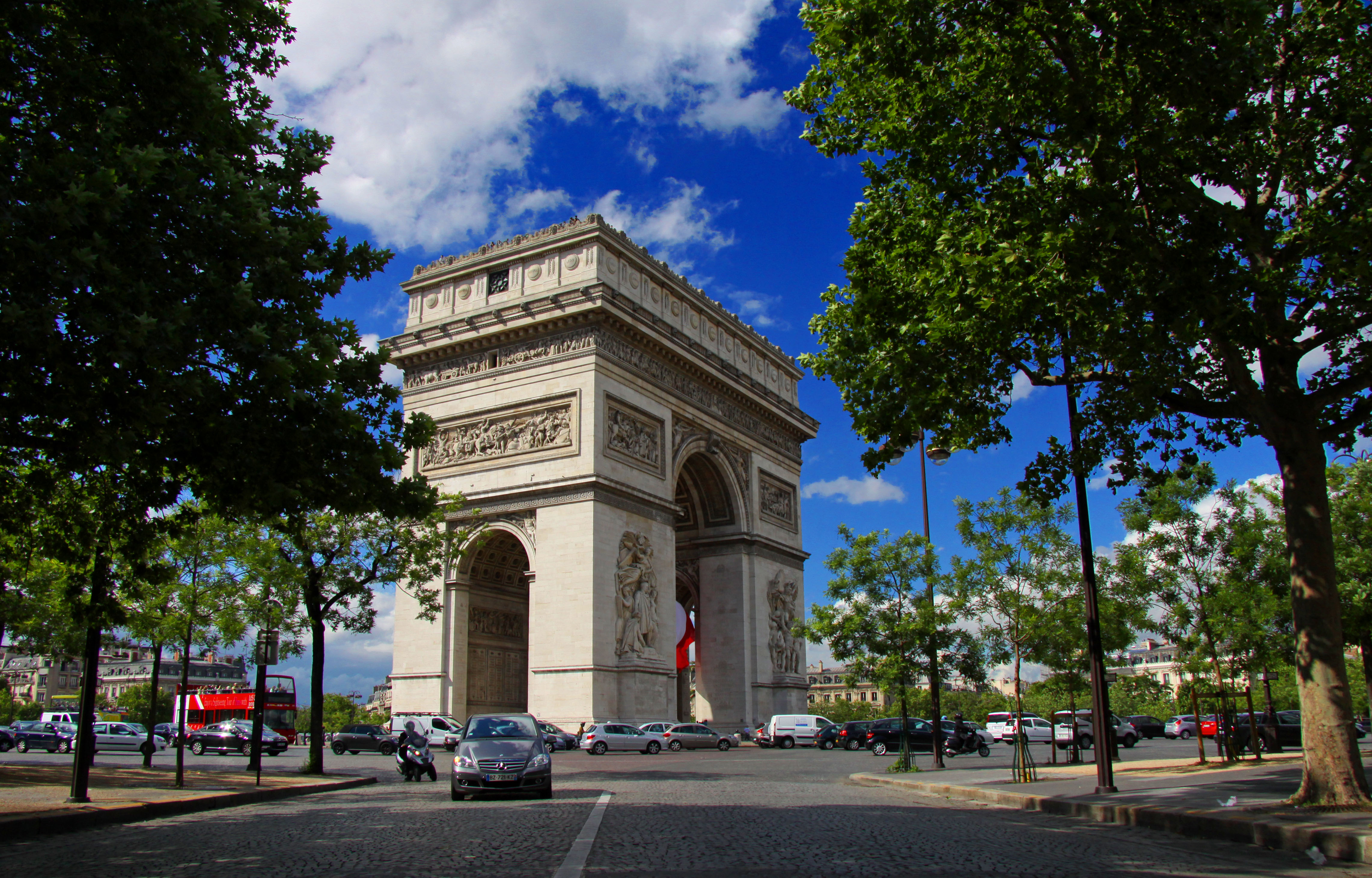
- View of the Place Charles de Gaulle from the Avenue d'Iéna

- Location within Paris
- Length: 241 m (791 ft)
- Width: 241 m (791 ft)
- Arrondissement: 8th, 16th, 17th
- Quarter: Champs-Élysées, Faubourg du Roule, Chaillot, Ternes
- Coordinates: 48°52′26″N 2°17′41″E

Construction
- Completed: 1670
- Denomination: 13 November 1970

The Place Charles de Gaulle (French: [plas ʃaʁl(ə) də ɡol]), historically known as the Place de l'Étoile (French: [plas d(ə) letwal]), is a large road junction in Paris, France, the meeting point of twelve straight avenues (hence its historic name, which translates as "Square of the Star") including the Champs-Élysées. It was renamed in 1970, following the death of former President Charles de Gaulle. It is still often referred to by its original name; the nearby Métro and RER station retains the designation Charles de Gaulle–Étoile. Paris's Axe historique ("historical axis") cuts through the Arc de Triomphe, which stands at the centre of the Place Charles de Gaulle.

== History ==
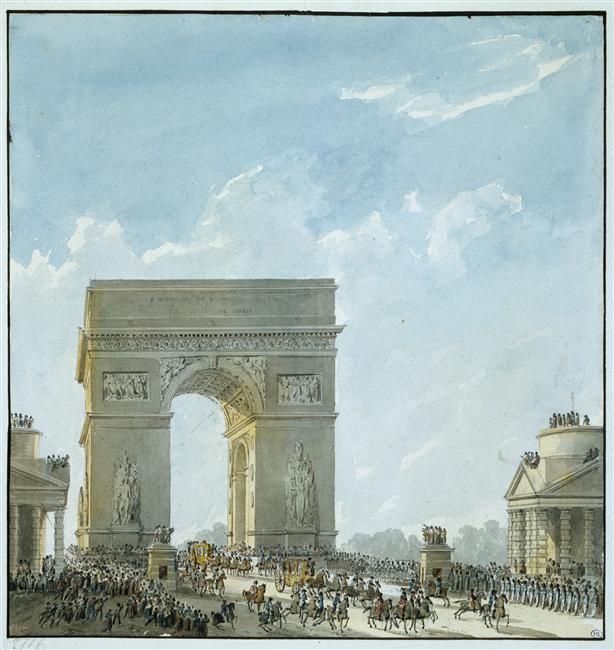
The Barrière de l'Étoile buildings in front of a wooden mock-up of the Arc de Triomphe in 1810.

The original name of the area was the Butte Chaillot ("Chaillot Mound", named after the locality). At the time, it was the point of convergence of several hunting trails. The Marquis de Marigny constructed monumental roadworks, completed in 1777, on the mound when he was establishing the plantations along the Champs-Élysées. The junction included paving of the road in the form of a star, as it still exists today and became known as the Place de l'Étoile.

In 1787, the Wall of the Ferme générale (Mur des Fermiers généraux), and the two toll houses of the Barrière de l'Étoile (also known as the Barrière de Neuilly) were built to the design of Claude Nicolas Ledoux for the collection of the octroi tax at the entrance to Paris. They were located on either side of the Place de l'Étoile until their demolition after 1859.

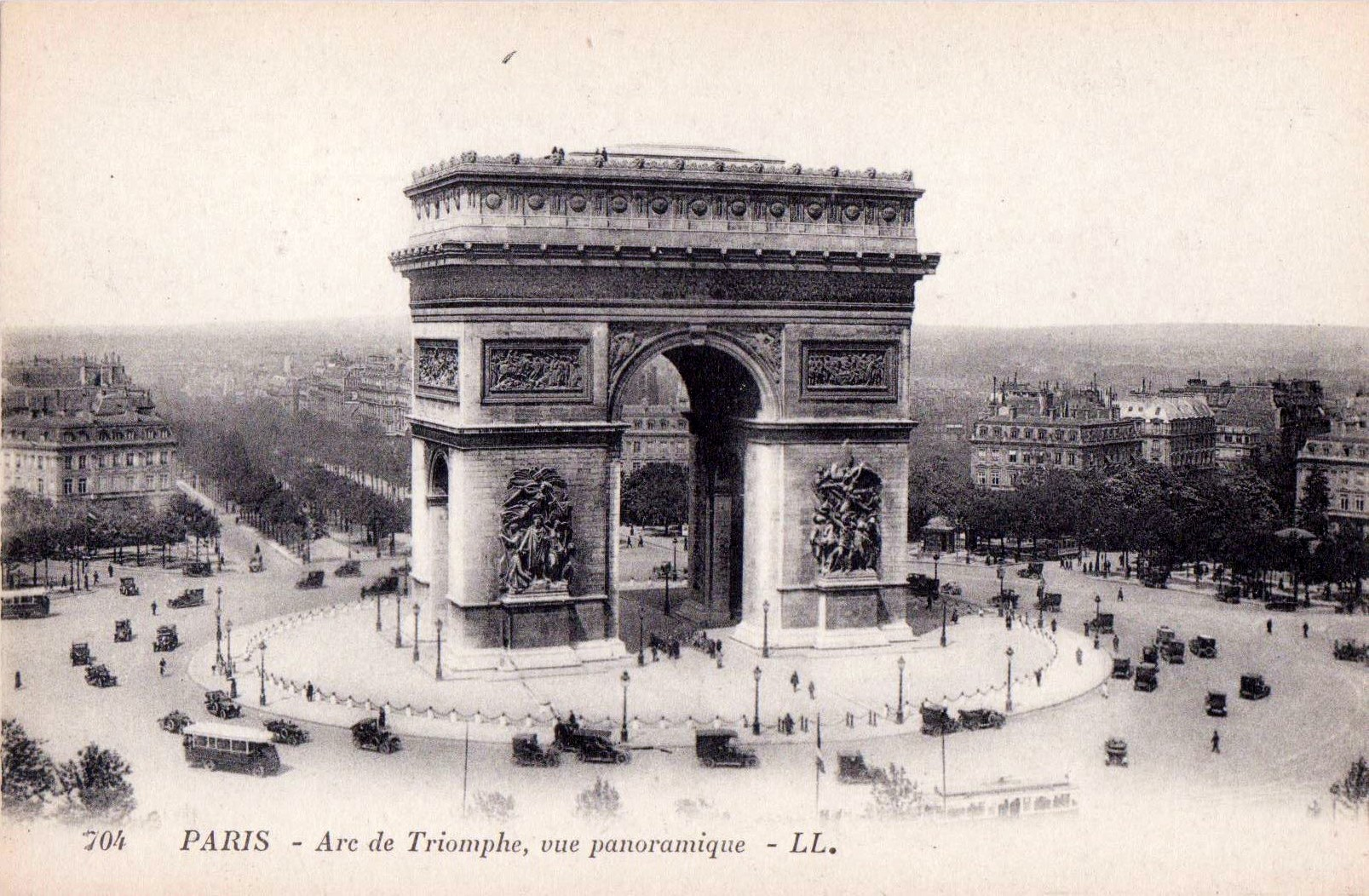
The Place de l'Étoile, c. 1920.

Between 1806 and 1836, the Arc de Triomphe de l'Étoile was built to the design of Jean-François Chalgrin. It was originally commissioned by Emperor Napoleon I during the First French Empire and inaugurated three decades later by King Louis Philippe I under the July Monarchy.

The avenues radiating from the Place de l'Étoile were created during the Second French Empire of Emperor Napoleon III as part of Haussmann's renovation of Paris. The square was completely redesigned with avenues de Bezons (now Wagram), Joséphine (now Marceau), Kléber, de Saint-Cloud (now Victor-Hugo), Essling (now Carnot), Prince-Jérôme (now Mac-Mahon and Niel) forming with the Champs-Élysées and other existing avenues a star around the Arc de Triomphe.

In 1864, the circular street surrounding the Place de l'Étoile was named Rue de Presbourg (south of the Axe historique) and Rue de Tilsitt (north of the Axe historique), after the diplomatic successes of Napoleon which led to the signing of the Treaty of Presbourg in 1805 and the Treaties of Tilsit in 1807.

Since 1921, beneath the Arc de Triomphe lies the Tomb of the Unknown Soldier. After the death of President Charles de Gaulle in 1970, the Place de l'Étoile was renamed the Place Charles de Gaulle.

== Description ==
=== Map ===
Twelve avenues radiate from the Place Charles de Gaulle, formerly named the Place de l'Étoile, forming a star with the Arc de Triomphe at its centre.

The Place Charles de Gaulle has a diameter of 241 metres (791 ft), giving it an area of approximately 4.55 hectares (11.2 acres). It is the second largest square in Paris, after the Place de la Concorde (8.64 hectares). At the centre of the square stands the Arc de Triomphe, which is accessible via a pedestrian underpass, to avoid the confluence of vehicular traffic from the juncture of twelve radiating avenues.

=== Avenues ===
The Place de l'Étoile was renamed the Place Charles de Gaulle in 1970.

The twelve avenues, clockwise from the north, are the following:

1. Avenue de Wagram (thus called since the Second Empire) and Boulevard de l'Étoile or Boulevard Bezons before
2. Avenue Hoche: Avenue de la Reine-Hortense during the Second Empire and Boulevard Monceau before
3. Avenue de Friedland since the Second Empire and Boulevard Beaujon before
4. Avenue des Champs-Élysées
5. Avenue Marceau: Avenue Joséphine during the Second Empire
6. Avenue d'Iéna
7. Avenue Kléber: Avenue du Roi-de-Rome during the Second Empire and Boulevard de Passy before
8. Avenue Victor-Hugo: Avenue d'Eylau during the Second Empire and Avenue de Saint-Cloud before
9. Avenue Foch: Avenue du Bois during the Third Republic and Avenue de l'Impératrice during the Second Empire
10. Avenue de la Grande Armée during the Second Empire and Avenue de Neuilly before
11. Avenue Carnot: Avenue d'Essling during the Second Empire
12. Avenue Mac-Mahon: Avenue du Prince-Jérôme during the Second Empire

=== Axes ===
Six axes are formed by the twelve avenues radiating from the Place Charles de Gaulle. The Axe historique extends from the Avenue des Champs-Élysées (at the bottom of the image) to the Avenue de la Grande Armée (at the top).

The Place Charles de Gaulle is symmetrical and thus has six axes:

1. Axis Avenue de Wagram and Avenue Kléber
2. Axis Avenue Hoche and Avenue Victor-Hugo
3. Axis Avenue de Friedland and Avenue Foch
4. Axis Avenue des Champs-Élysées and Avenue de la Grande Armée which is the Axe historique of Paris
5. Axis Avenue Marceau and Avenue Carnot
6. Axis Avenue d'Iéna and Avenue Mac-Mahon

=== Arrondissements ===
The Place Charles de Gaulle (as well as the Arc de Triomphe) is split between the 8th, 16th and 17th arrondissements of Paris. The 8th arrondissement encompasses the area between Avenue de Wagram and Avenue Marceau (to the east). The 16th arrondissement encompasses the area between Avenue Marceau and Avenue de la Grande Armée (to the south and west). The 17th arrondissement encompasses the area between Avenue de la Grande Armée and Avenue de Wagram (to the north).

== Literature ==
La Place de l'Étoile is the title of a novel by French writer Patrick Modiano.

== Transportation ==
Located near the Métro station: Charles de Gaulle–Étoile.

The Place Charles de Gaulle is served by Métro and RER services. Line 1, as well as RER A, run under the Avenue de la Grande Armée and Champs-Élysées and stop at the station. The station is also served by Line 2 and serves as the western terminus of Line 6.

== Gallery ==
A colourised aerial photograph of the Place de l'Étoile in 1921

The Place Charles de Gaulle seen from the Avenue des Champs-Élysées in 2019

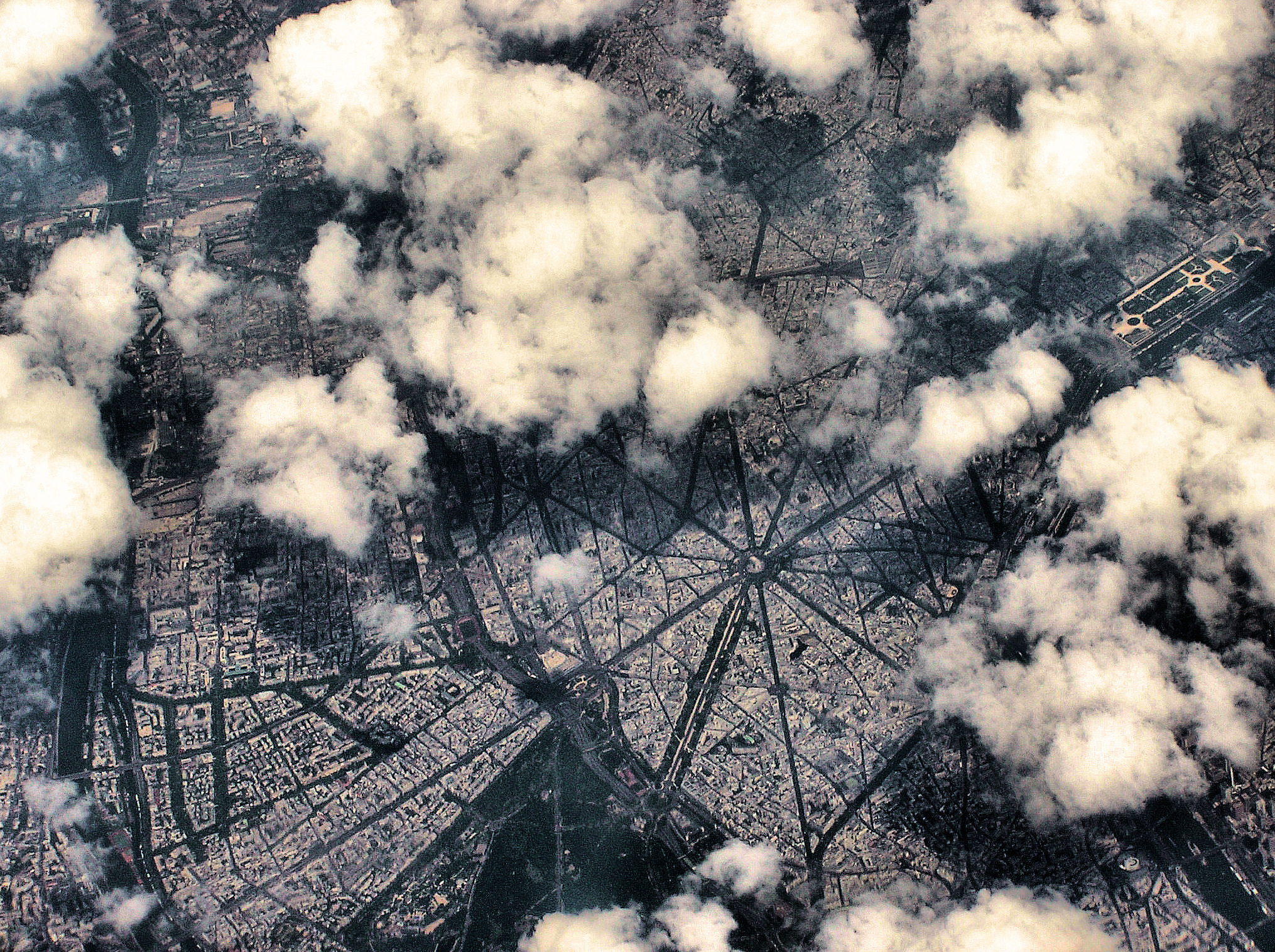
The Place Charles de Gaulle seen from an airliner at 35,000 feet (11,000 m)

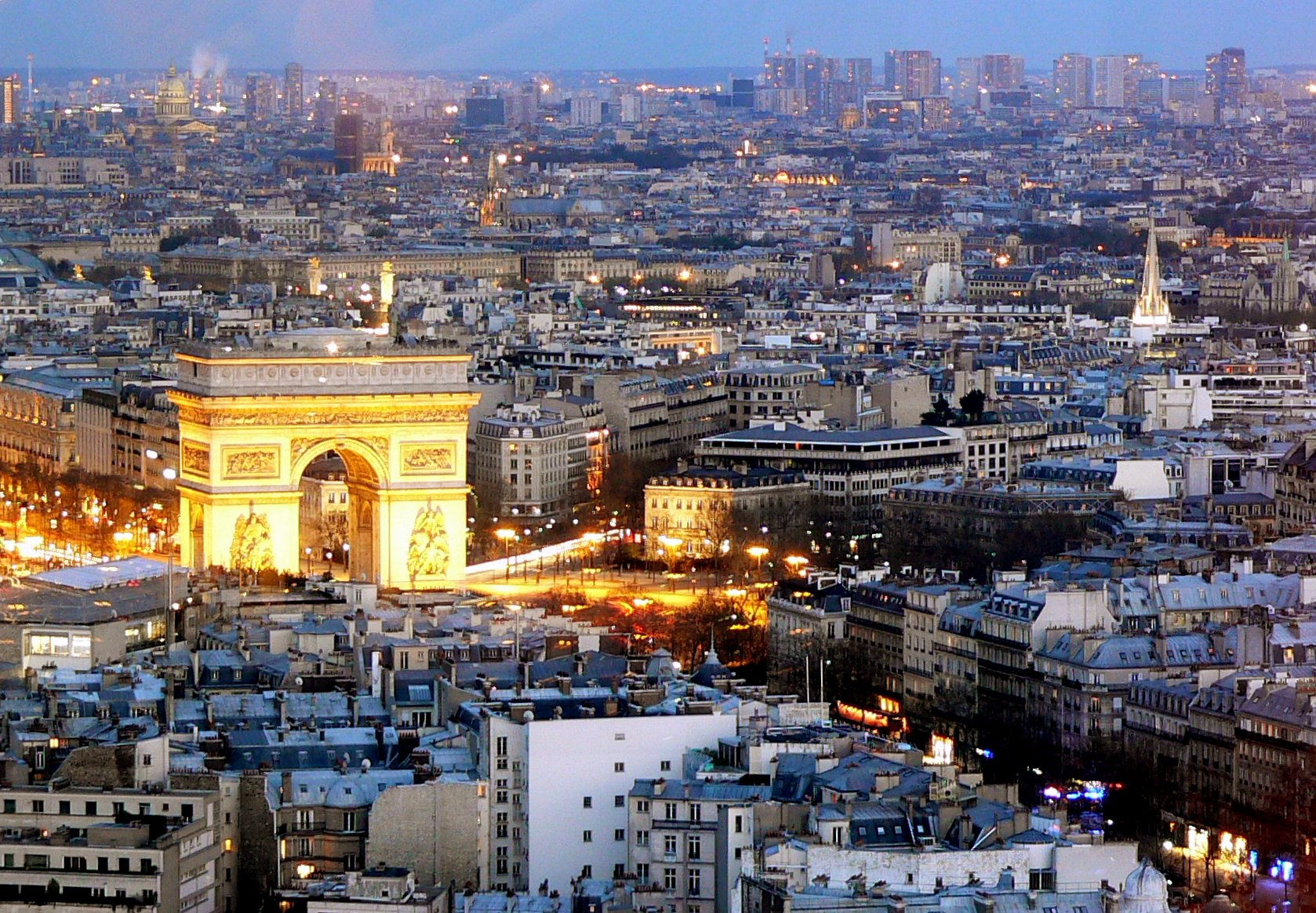
The Avenue de la Grande Armée and Place Charles de Gaulle at sunset

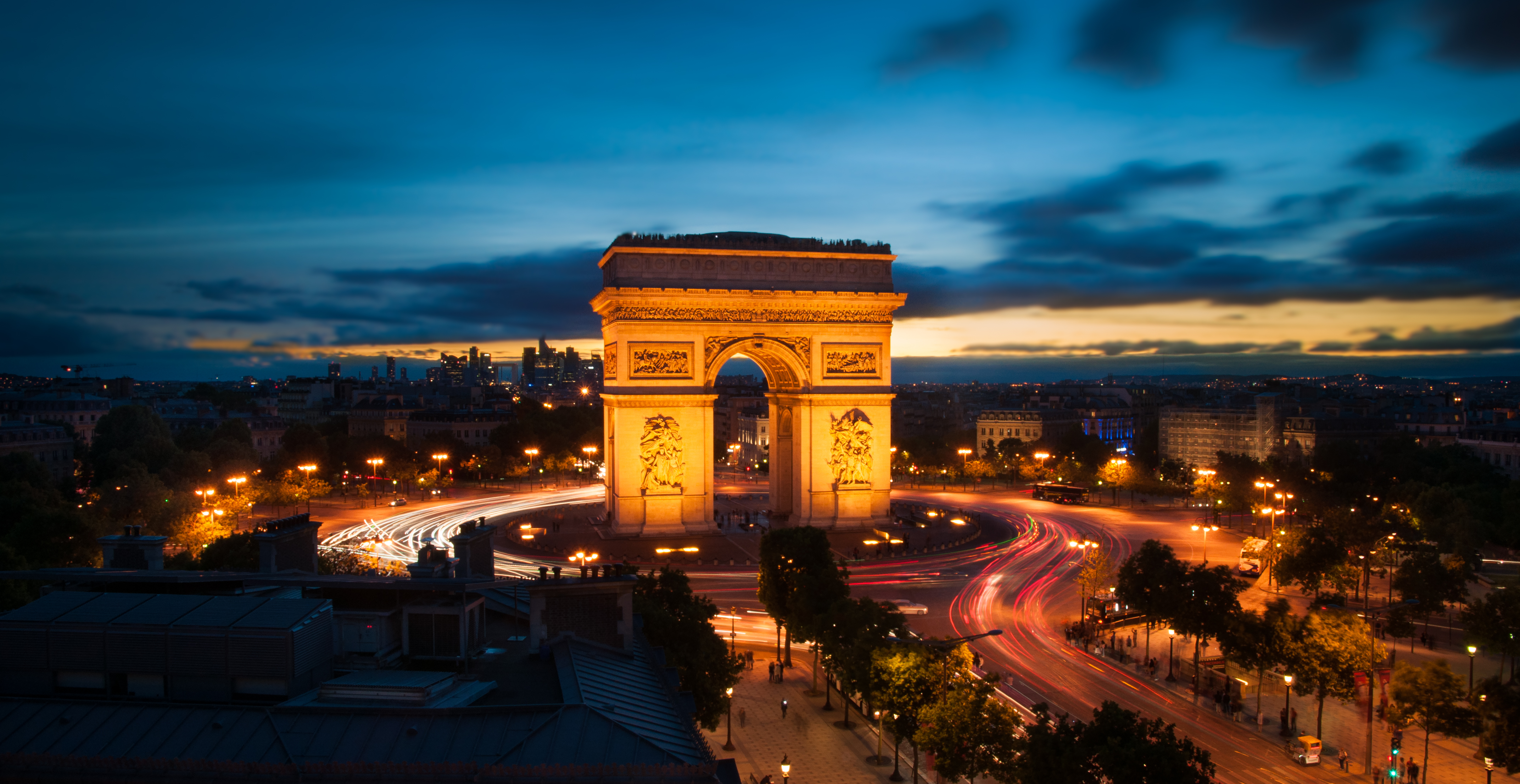
The Place Charles de Gaulle at night

== See also ==
- Squares in Paris
- Axe historique
