= Matignon (surname) =

Matignon is a French surname. Notable people with the surname include:

- Camille Matignon (1867–1934), French chemist
- Guillaume Matignon, French trading card game player
- Pierre Matignon (1943–1987), French cyclist
- Renaud Matignon (1936–1998), French journalist and writer
