= Louis Leplée =

French businessman (1883–1936)

Louis Leplee
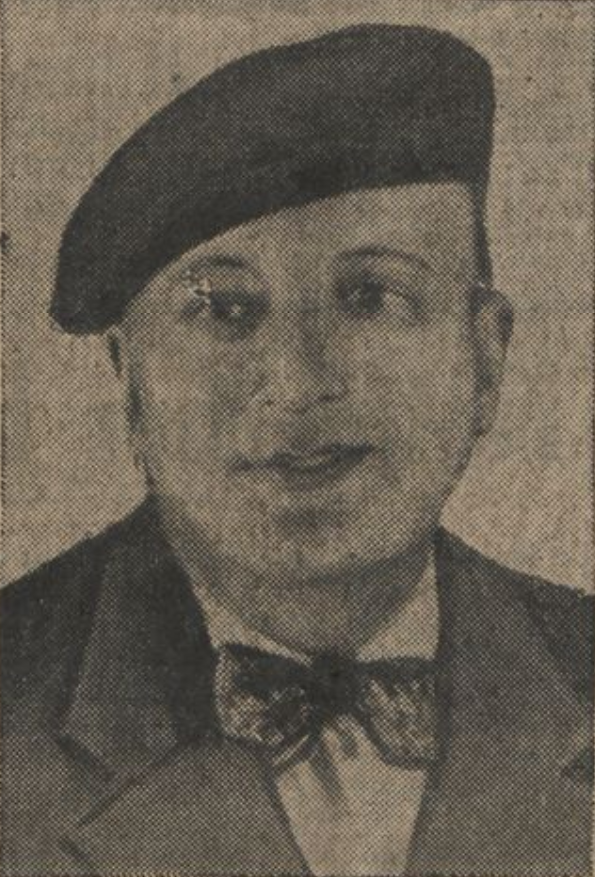
- Leplée in a 1937 newspaper
- Born: 7 April 1883; Bayonne, France
- Died: 6 April 1936 (aged 52); Paris, France
- Occupations: Nightclub owner, music promotor
- Known for: Discovery and promotion of singer-songwriter and actress Edith Piaf

Louis Leplée (7 April 1883 – April 6, 1936) was a French nightclub owner who discovered French entertainer Édith Piaf singing on a Paris street corner in 1935. Leplée starred Piaf at the popular Parisian nightspot Le Gerny's as "La Môme Piaf" (The Little Sparrow) and helped start her career.

In Paris, Leplée operated several nightclubs. His first successful club was Liberty's Bar, but he decided to leave and open a restaurant to take a break from the extravagances of entertainment. After this short break, he returned to the Parisian night life with Le Gerny's where he later employed Piaf as a singer. Leplée also maintained links to the Parisian underworld and was active in Paris's homosexual culture.

Leplée was murdered in his apartment in Paris, on 6 April 1936. Piaf was questioned extensively by the police before being cleared of wrongdoing. The case has never been solved, and there has been speculation and theories of mob involvement in Leplée's death.

== Early and personal life ==
Leplée was born on 7 April 1883 in Bayonne, located in southwestern France near the Pyrenees. He served in the French army during World War I. In the fighting, he was wounded in his left leg, leaving him limping for the rest of his life.

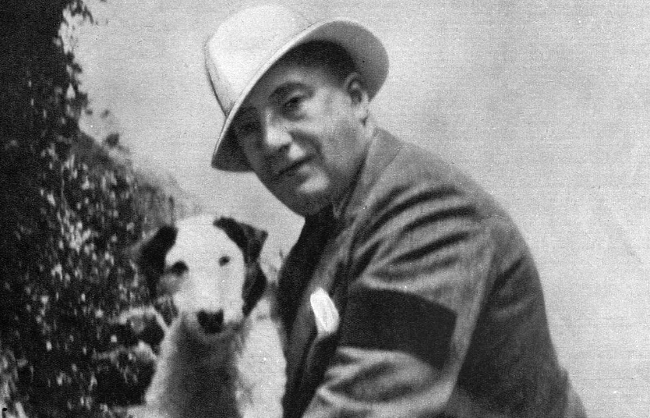
Leplée with a dog.

In Leplée's personal life, he was characterised by his casualness and showiness. On vacations, he often visited the beach. Leplée had a good sense of humour and excelled in organising parties. Leplée was also known to be homosexual, and he did not conceal that. Particularly, he was attracted to young men and was described as a hebephile (sexual preference for 11-14 years olds) by Luc Dornain when writing in Le Nouveau Détective. Leplée frequently hired gay prostitutes from Place Pigalle, Place de la Madeleine or homosexual clubs at night. In the day, he sometimes frequented to hammams to solicit with other men. In 1934, Leplée took a young gay prostitute named "Panther" to his hotel near Place de la Madeleine, whereupon Panther threatened him and robbed him of his wallet.

== Career ==
=== Entertainer ===
When Leplée first worked in Paris, he was a salesman of women's novelties and was helped by his uncle Polin, a comic trouper, to enter the entertainment industry. Leplée performed as an entertainer singing at the Casino de Paris alongside Maurice Chevalier. However, his singing abilities deteriorated with age and his voice could not reach as far as he used to.

=== Nightclub owner ===
Leplée had good connections with Oscar Dufrenne, a music hall director and politician who was the municipal councilor of the 10th arrondissement of Paris. Dufrenne gave Leplée access to a basement to set up a small nightclub catering to American tourists, beginning Leplée's career in owning and managing nightclubs. Dufrenne, also a notable homosexual politician for the Radical Party, ultimately ended up sharing a similar fate to Leplée as he was murdered in 1933 with no convictions for his death. Once Leplée had enough wealth, he established Liberty's Bar in Place Blanche. It proved successful and included cabaret shows. Leplée often sang whilst dressed as a woman at the bar. His partner at the Liberty's Bar, Robert Giguet, also dressed as a woman when greeting customers. He was considered the "prince" of the Montmartre homosexual subculture. When Leplée grew tired with Montmartre, he handed ownership of the bar to Giguet.

From Montmartre, Leplée relocated to a quieter part of Paris in the 8th arrondissement of Paris where he established Le Gerny's, a restaurant that significantly deviated from the flashiness and glamour of Liberty's. Still, he felt attached to his previous life and opened a new Le Gerny at 54 rue Pierre-Charron in Paris's Champs-Elysées as a nightclub and cabaret. It is believed Le Gerny's was a part of the Paris underworld of crime and gay prostitution. The nightclub operated from 9 p.m. to 4 a.m., and had a plentiful supply of fruits, meats and champagne. Le Gerney's was often full, and was a popular spot for actresses, writers and young politicians to mingle.

=== Work with Édith Piaf ===
In 1935, Leplée discovered Édith Gassion (Piaf) performing on a street in Paris. She had been making a living from singing on Parisian streets since she was 15 years old and by 1935 was performing around Pigalle in Paris's caberet area. Leplée stopped to watch her sing before offering her a job as resident singer at Le Gerny's. Her nervousness and short statue at 142 centimetres (4 ft 8 in) led Leplée to give her the stage name La Môme Piaf (The Little Sparrow). Under Leplée, Piaf was taught about stage presence and told to wear a black dress that later became her trademark apparel. Piaf's singing proved beneficial for Leplée's business, and helped Piaf make a name for herself and connect with other leading French artists. In 1936, he helped her record her first 78 rpm single, "Les Mômes de la cloche". His relationship with Piaf was warm, with her calling him "Papa Leplée".

== Murder and investigation ==
In the days leading up to Leplée's murder on 6 April 1936, people had called Le Gerny's asking for him but hung up whenever a waiter answered instead. He also received anonymous threats and felt uneasy in his final days. He had an apartment on the 6th floor of a residence on Avenue de la Grande-Armée. Each morning, Leplée was visited by his old Italian maid, Thérèse. Thérèse arrived with her daughter at 8:30 a.m. on April 6 and had breakfast in Leplée's apartment whilst he slept. The daughter left an hour later and, on the 5th floor, passed by a group of four men wearing suits walking up. The men entered Leplée's residence, gagged Thérèse, and shot the half-naked Leplée in his bed. Afterwards, they searched the residence but failed to find Leplée's envelope of ₣20,000 he recently received from the sale of an apartment on the Champs-Elysées. When Thérèse was later interrogated, she reported that the men spoke with Spanish accents. At 10:20 a.m., film actress Edmonde Guy tried to contact Leplée over the telephone but was told by one of assailants that he was sleeping. When they left 10 minutes later, Thérèse was able to alert the neighbours, who called the police. During the inspection of the residence, the police found little evidence of who the men were. Leplée's funeral was held on April 11 at the church of Saint-Honoré d'Eylau.

Édith Piaf, who was in Cannes at the time of the murder, was arrested and questioned over her supposed ties to the murderers. Because Piaf had been known to associate with the mafia when she was living in the tougher areas of Paris, the police initially believed she had brought the attention of the French mafia upon Leplée. After a few hours of interrogation, she was released due to a lack of evidence. Leplée's death was traumatic for Piaf, who had grown close to him, and she became the centre of attention for the French media in the case. After Piaf, one of her past lovers – Albert Valette – became the primary suspect of the murder. Piaf had previously gone to Leplée for protection from Valette, who confronted him. Valette, however, was never convicted.

Thérèse, the main witness, proved unable to identify anyone. Parisian police conducted several raids to arrest suspected young men, but released them when they failed to link anyone to the fingerprints of the murderers. Several reasons behind why Leplée was murdered have also been proposed. One states that he was the victim of extortionists making an example out of him for refusing his demands. Leplée had previously confided in a friend his concerns and fears of gangsters threatening him. Ultimately, no individuals were ever identified as any of the four murderers and Leplée's murder remains unsolved.

== In popular culture ==
He is portrayed by Gérard Depardieu in the 2007 film La Môme, also known as La Vie en Rose.
