= Confédération générale du patronat français =

French manufacturers' association

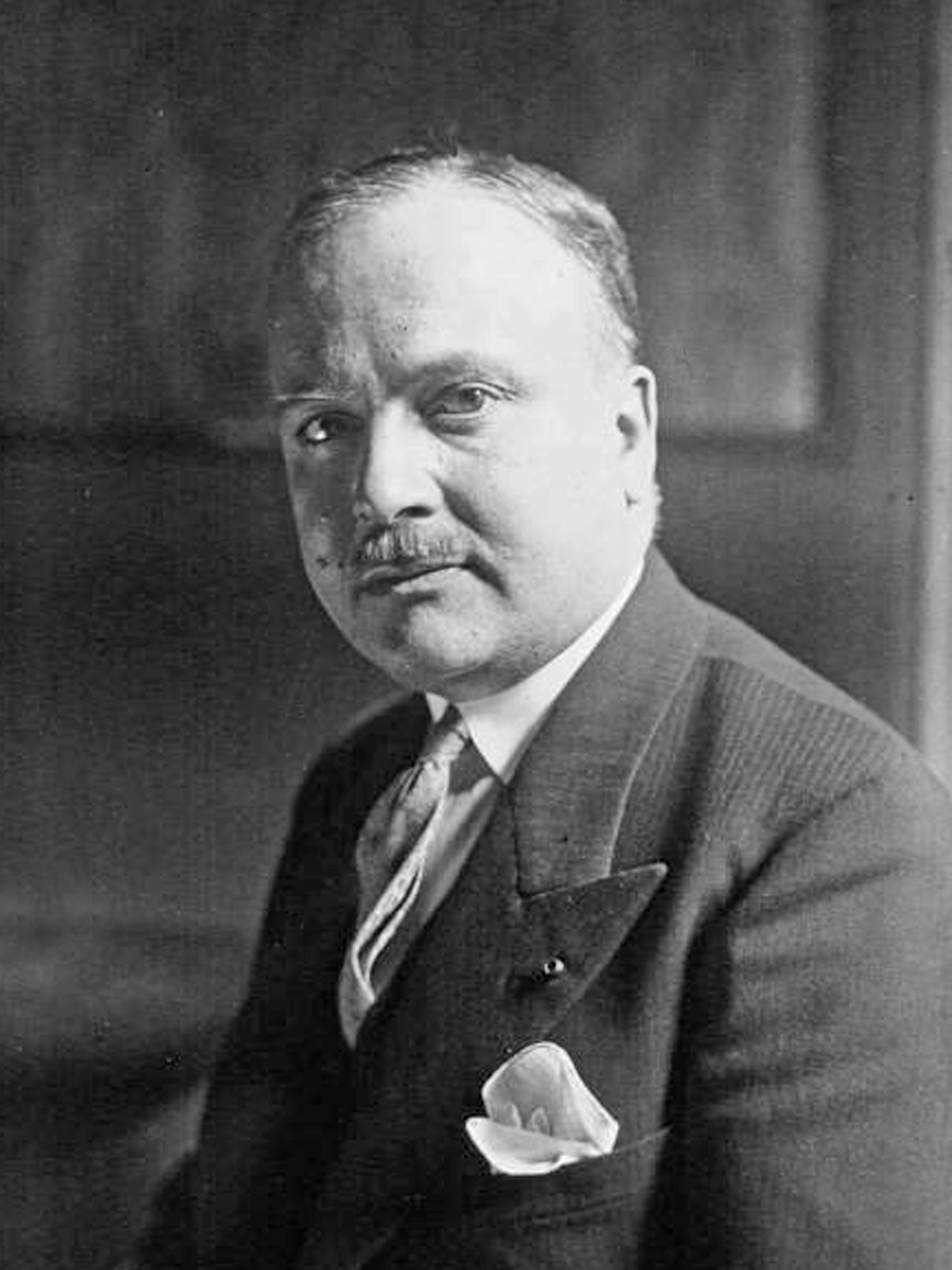
- Claude-Joseph Gignoux, President of the CGPF
- Predecessor: Confédération générale de la production française
- Formation: August 4, 1936
- Dissolved: November 9, 1940; 85 years ago
- Legal status: Defunct
- Purpose: Employers' association
- Location: Paris, France
- President: Claude-Joseph Gignoux

The Confédération générale du patronat français (CGPF: General Confederation of French Proprietors) was a French manufacturers' association during the last years of the French Second Republic from 1936 to 1940. It supported the rights of patrons and opposed trade union activity other than discussion of factory workplace conditions. In the lead-up to World War II (1939–1945) the CGPF resisted organizing industry to prepare for war.

== Formation ==
On 7 June 1936 Alexandre Lambert-Ribot, secretary general of the Comité des forges, the iron and steel manufacturers' association, signed the Matignon Agreements to end the general strike that followed election of the Popular Front. The Matignon Agreements forced a change in the leadership of the Confédération générale de la production française (CGPF) manufacturers's organization. The changes were approved by the heavy industrialists, There were, for example, close links between Pierre Nicolle of the CGPF and François de Wendel of the Comité des forges. The reforms to the CGPF were announced on 4 August 1936.

The new CGPF included several new federations, including the Confédération des Groupements Commerciaux, which became the Union Commerciale Professionelle within the CGPF. The Fédération des Associations Régionales (FAR), which represented provincial employers in the CGPF, was to play a more important role, and commerce was to be better represented. The CGPF central council was to be expanded from 90 to 150 members. The name of the organization was changed to the Confédération générale du patronat français to reflect the broader representation.

== Structure ==
The CGPF was made up of groups, each of which contained associations but not firms or individuals. Each group had a Committee of Direction, elected yearly by the General Assembly. The Committee of Direction named its Bureau, which must include a president, two vice-presidents, a treasurer and a secretary. Although subject to overall CGPF policies, in most respects the groups were each autonomous, self-sufficient and self-governing. The restructured CGPF had 34 professional groups and more than 80 regional associations. The CGPF had officers elected after the annual CGPF General Assembly by the CGPF Central Council, which was made up of the presidents of the Committees of Direction of the groups. The officers were the president, five vice-presidents, a treasurer and two secretaries. They formed the Central Administration of the CGPF, and had great authority.

On 9 October 1936 the CGPF held a general assembly to elect its new board. René-Paul Duchemin, president of the former CGPF, declined renewal of his mandate, but was named honorary president. Duchemin was ousted mainly because of his lack of forcefulness. He was replaced as president by Claude-Joseph Gignoux, former undersecretary of state and director of the Journée Industrielle. Alexandre de Lavergne was named vice-president delegate general, Baron Charles Petiet as treasurer and Louis Defert as secretary. The CGPF established a social office in the fall of 1936 to handle labour relations.

== History ==
Gignoux proved an energetic leader. He said that employers must not try to avoid their responsibilities, but must confirm their authority through united action. The CGPF launched a campaign to defend the rights of the patronat. The right to collective bargaining enshrined in the Matignon agreement was a challenge to the authority of the patron. A CGPF leader wrote in 1937, "It is necessary to decide a question of principal, it is essential to know whether we will be masters of our own homes." The CGPF considered that strikes were illegal, and trade unions should stay out of politics and limit themselves to working conditions at the factory level.

Colonel Paul Brenot of the Chambre Syndicale des Industries Radioélectriques was the driving force in persuading the CGPF to form a social committee. He made sure it did not include Alexandre Lambert-Ribot, secretary of the Comité des Forges and representative of the heavy industry oligarchy. After their relationship settled down, Brenot's Comité de prévoyance et d'action sociale (CPAS) worked closely with the CGPF. Aymé Bernard of the Reims Chamber of Commerce was brought into the CGPF after 1936. He was said to be more important than Etienne Fougère, the president of the FAR. Other leaders of the post-1936 CGPF included Pierre Nicolle and Verger.

As late as 1939, most industrialists were opposed to ententes to control output and prices, which they saw as a step towards greater state control of their firms. The CGPF president told the government that ententes must not lead to "displacement of economic authority" from the individual firms. A senior CGPF official asserted that "The patron must be the sole chief. ... Whether in peace of war this affirmation has the brutal force of an axiom." The result was that neither industry nor the state were organizing economic mobilization in face of the challenge of Nazi Germany. In the early part of 1939 Gigoux warned the CGPF members of the danger of government demands to rehire workers who had been fired after the general strike, since this would only lead to further government intervention. He urged industrialists to make the present arrangement work, since socialism was the only alternative. The CGP and UIMM both supported a healthy civil economy, which limited military preparations.

After the outbreak of World War II, during the initial "Phoney War" period from September 1939 to May 1940, the CGPF continue to oppose government involvement in the economy, saying this was exactly what the Allies were fighting against. The CGPF also put pressure on its members to improve child care, canteens, heath services and financial assistance to families of soldiers who had been mobilized, since paternalism included the responsibility for the workers' well-being.

== Dissolution ==
After the defeat of France in June 1940 and installation of the Vichy government, on 9 November 1940 the Minister of Industrial Production and Minister of Labour, René Belin, signed a decree dissolving the General Confederation of Labour (CGT), the French Confederation of Christian Workers (CFTC) and the Confédération Générale du Patronat Français. The regional section of the CGPF, the FAR, remained and served the same function as the CGPF in the early part of the war. Baron Charles Petiet, who headed the CGPF social section, saw dissolution of the CGPF as a minor consequence of dissolution of the CGT. With the labour movement suppressed, the industrial leaders lost interest in the CGPF.

On 27 July 1944 the Free French government in Algiers annulled the Vichy decrees, dissolved the Peasant Corporation (Corporation paysanne) and reestablished all the syndicates of 1939 apart from the CGPF. The Conseil national du patronat français was created in December 1945.

== Sources ==
- Brady, Robert A. (2001), Business As a System of Power, Transaction Publishers, ISBN 978-1-4128-1902-2
- "Chronologie : histoire des relations du travail depuis la loi Le Chapelier de 1791", Vie Publique, Direction de l'Information Légale et Administrative, archived from the original on 2011-01-13
- Guillaume, Sylvie (2008), Les PME Dans Les Sociétés Contemporaines de 1880 À Nos Jours: Pouvoir, Représentation, Action (in French), Peter Lang, ISBN 978-90-5201-432-6
- Imlay, Talbot C. (2003), Facing the Second World War: Strategy, Politics, and Economics in Britain and France, 1938-1940, Oxford University Press, ISBN 978-0-19-926122-2
- "L'Oligarchie Economique", Les Documents Politiques, Diplomatiques et Financiers (in French), Paris, October 1936
- Vinen, Richard (2002-08-08), The Politics of French Business 1936-1945, Cambridge University Press, ISBN 978-0-521-52240-3
