= Le Gerny's =

Coordinates: 48.8692°N 2.3028°E

Le Gerny's is the name of a former Parisian nightclub located at 54 rue Pierre-Charron, at the intersection with the rue François-Ier, in the quartier des Champs-Élysées of the 8th arrondissement of Paris.

The nightclub is now mostly known as the venue where internationally renowned singer-songwriter Edith Piaf, made her professional debut, after its owner and director Louis Leplee, spotted her singing on a Paris street, and promoted her giving her the nickname "la môme Piaf", (The Little Sparrow) in October 1935, when performing at his club, with a 40 francs salary per evening.

== See also ==
- List of theatres and entertainment venues in Paris
