= Confédération générale de la production française =

French manufacturers' association

- Successor: Confédération générale du patronat français
- Formation: March 19, 1919
- Founder: Étienne Clémentel
- Dissolved: August 4, 1936; 90 years ago
- Legal status: Defunct

The Confédération générale de la production française (CGPF: General Confederation of French Production) was a French manufacturers' association.

== Foundation ==
The Confédération générale de la production française (CGPF) was created at the initiative of Étienne Clémentel. It was founded on 19 March 1919, bringing together 21 employers' federations in an attempt to unite previously competing groups. The CGPF demanded complete freedom from government interference, but the right to participate in any government action that might affect the interests of its members. The Union des industries et métiers de la métallurgie (UIMM) acted in effect as the instrument of the Comité des forges steelmakers' association for handling social issues. The UIMM provided logistic support to the Confédération générale de la production française (CGPF), with the result that the CGPF was accused of being simply a puppet of the steel industry.

== History ==
The Fédération des Associations Régionales (FAR), founded in 1919 to represent provincial businesses, was absorbed into the CGPF in 1923. By 1936 the CGPF had 28 branches. The CGPF claimed to represent all employees, but in fact was mainly controlled by large industrial concerns with headquarters in Paris, particularly metallurgy companies, and was weak in areas such as commerce and banking. The CGPF made its views public on all major issues that affect the economy or social organization. It had special committees to review tax and tariff issues. In the financial crisis of 1925 the CGPF supported Raymond Poincaré's policy and opposed that of the Cartel des Gauches.

The government generally chose the CGPF as the agency to represent employers on governmental committees. Thus the CGPF participated in the National Economic Council, National Council of Handicrafts, Higher Council on Educational Methods, Higher Commission on Occupational Diseases, Industrial Hygienic Commission and Commission on Engineering Awards. The CGPF represent French employers at the International Labor Office. The CGPF was the voice of French industry at the International Economic Conference (1927), International Committee of Economic Experts (1931) and Lausanne Conference (1932).

Before 1936–36 the CGFP was handicapped by rivalry among the different industrial groups and by lack of a strong domestic opponent. The International Labor Office said of the CGPF that, "In practice ... the General Confederation of Production is, beyond doubt, only a permanent meeting place for the heads of different federations; its power is ephemeral, inasmuch as it depends on their consent, and yet considerable, if, by the exchange of views, it brings about unanimity between them. The growing power of the General Confederation of Labour (CGT: Confédération générale du travail) forced the CGPF to transform itself into a more effective organization.

When the CGPF central council met on 15 May 1936, just after the election of the Popular Front, it was still mostly concerned with minor internal arrangements. Aymé Bernard was the only member who brought up a political situation. He said,

I do not think that we are on the eve of disturbances in the streets, but M. Blum is going to take power sooner or later and I think that, while not despairing of the fate of our country, we must know what we are going to do...In practice one of two things [will happen): either the socialist experiment will succeed and it will be a matter of knowing what we can do to avoid passing completely under the absolute control of a totalitarian state, or this experiment will not succeed, and then, it will end up with bloodshed ... in either case, it will be necessary to reduce the damage to a minimum, I do not say avoid it.

On 7 June 1936 Alexandre Lambert-Ribot, secretary general of the Comité des forges, signed the Matignon Agreements to end the general strike that had ensued. CGPF President René-Paul Duchemin signed on behalf of French employers. Forces led by the de Wendels and Rothschilds, who were hostile to Duchemin's labour policies, forced an Extraordinary General Assembly in August 1936 to reform the CGPF, which was renamed the Confédération générale du patronat français (CGPF) and given a new constitution and leadership.

== Publications ==
Publications included:

- Annuaire : répertoire des Syndicats patronaux français (in French), Paris, 1927–36, ISSN 2113-4650
- René-Paul Duchemin; Alexandre de Lavaissière de Lavergne (1934), Discours de M. M. R. P. Duchemin, président et de M. De Lavergne, délégué général à l'Assemblée générale du 23 mars 1934 (in French), Paris: Confédération générale de la production française, p. 29
- Accord général du 7 juin 1936 entre la Confédération générale du travail et la Confédération générale de la production française (in French), Paris: Confédération générale du travail. France / Impr. nationale, August 1936, p. 15

== Sources ==
- Brady, Robert A. (2001), Business As a System of Power, Transaction Publishers, ISBN 978-1-4128-1902-2
- "Chronologie : histoire des relations du travail depuis la loi Le Chapelier de 1791", Vie Publique, Direction de l'Information Légale et Administrative, archived from the original on 2011-01-13
- Confédération générale de la production française, BnF: Bibliotheque nationale de France
- Ehrmann, Henry Walter (2015-12-08), Organized Business in France, Princeton University Press, ISBN 978-1-4008-7832-1
- Guillaume, Sylvie (2008), Les PME Dans Les Sociétés Contemporaines de 1880 À Nos Jours: Pouvoir, Représentation, Action (in French), Peter Lang, ISBN 978-90-5201-432-6
- Imlay, Talbot C. (2003), Facing the Second World War: Strategy, Politics, and Economics in Britain and France, 1938-1940, Oxford University Press, ISBN 978-0-19-926122-2
- Maier, Charles S. (2015-10-27), Recasting Bourgeois Europe: Stabilization in France, Germany, and Italy in the Decade after World War I, Princeton University Press, ISBN 978-1-4008-7370-8
- Vinen, Richard (2002-08-08), The Politics of French Business 1936-1945, Cambridge University Press, ISBN 978-0-521-52240-3
