= Matignon Agreements (1936) =

1936 labor agreements in France

The Matignon Agreements (French: Accords de Matignon) were signed on 7 June 1936, between the Confédération générale de la production française (CGPF) employers' organization, the CGT trade union and the French state. They were signed during a massively followed general strike initiated after the election of the Popular Front in May 1936, which had led to the creation of a left-wing government headed by Léon Blum (SFIO). Sometimes referred to by legal scholars as the "Magna Carta of French Labor", these agreements were signed at the Hôtel Matignon, official residence of the head of the government, hence their name.

== May–June general strike and agreements ==
The negotiations, in which participated Benoît Frachon for the CGT, Marx Dormoy (SFIO) as under-secretary of state to the President of the Council, Jean-Baptiste Lebas (SFIO, Minister of Labour), had started on 6 June at 3 PM, but the pressure from the workers' movement was such that the employers' confederation quickly accepted the unions' terms. A general strike had been initiated in Le Havre on 26 May, accompanied by factory occupations to prevent lock outs, and had quickly spread to all of France. More than a million workers were on strike. The social movement immediately followed the electoral victory of the Popular Front, in order to reach this position of force. Interior Minister Roger Salengro publicly announced the following day the success of the negotiations.

Without having to organize strike in each factory in order to gain some advantages for them, all of the workers benefited with these agreements of:

- the legal right to strike
- the removal of all obstacles to union organization (including the right to have representatives, named délégués du personnel, elected by secret ballot, which may not be fired without approval from the labour inspection - inspection du travail - and thus are protected from pressures by the employers)
- and a blanket 7-12 percent wage increase for all workers (it is thus the reverse of deflation, and is an economic policy based on demand) (the female workers in Verdun even succeeded in obtaining a 400% wages increase)

Furthermore, Blum's government deposed on 5 June five law projects, prepared by the Minister of Labour Jean-Baptiste Lebas, which were easily adopted during the month. These laws granted:

- paid vacations (two weeks - for the first time in France) (voted by the National Assembly on 20 June 1936)
- 40-hour work week paid 48 (adopted by the Assembly on 21 June 1936).
- collective bargaining (adopted by the Assembly on 24 June 1936)
- the repeal of the 1935 decree-laws concerning the wages of public servants and the taxes on World War I veterans' pensions.

On 11 June, Maurice Thorez, national secretary of the French Communist Party (PCF), stated that "one must know how to finish a strike, at the moment that the main points have been obtained." His declaration was published in L'Humanité, the press organ of the PCF. Alluding to Marceau Pivert's famous statement, he recalled that "Not everything was possible but the slogan is still: 'Everything for the Popular Front!' 'Everything by the Popular Front'"

Work was resumed at the Renault factories on 13 and 15 June and in the steelworking industry.

== Legacy ==
The délégués du personnel were suppressed under Vichy, and re-established by the 16 April 1945 Act passed by the GPRF provisional government.

== See also ==
- Interwar France
- French Left
- Matignon Agreements (disambiguation)
- fr:Grèves de mai-juin 1936 en Alsace
- fr:délégué du personnel
