= Rue de Tilsitt =

Street in Paris, France

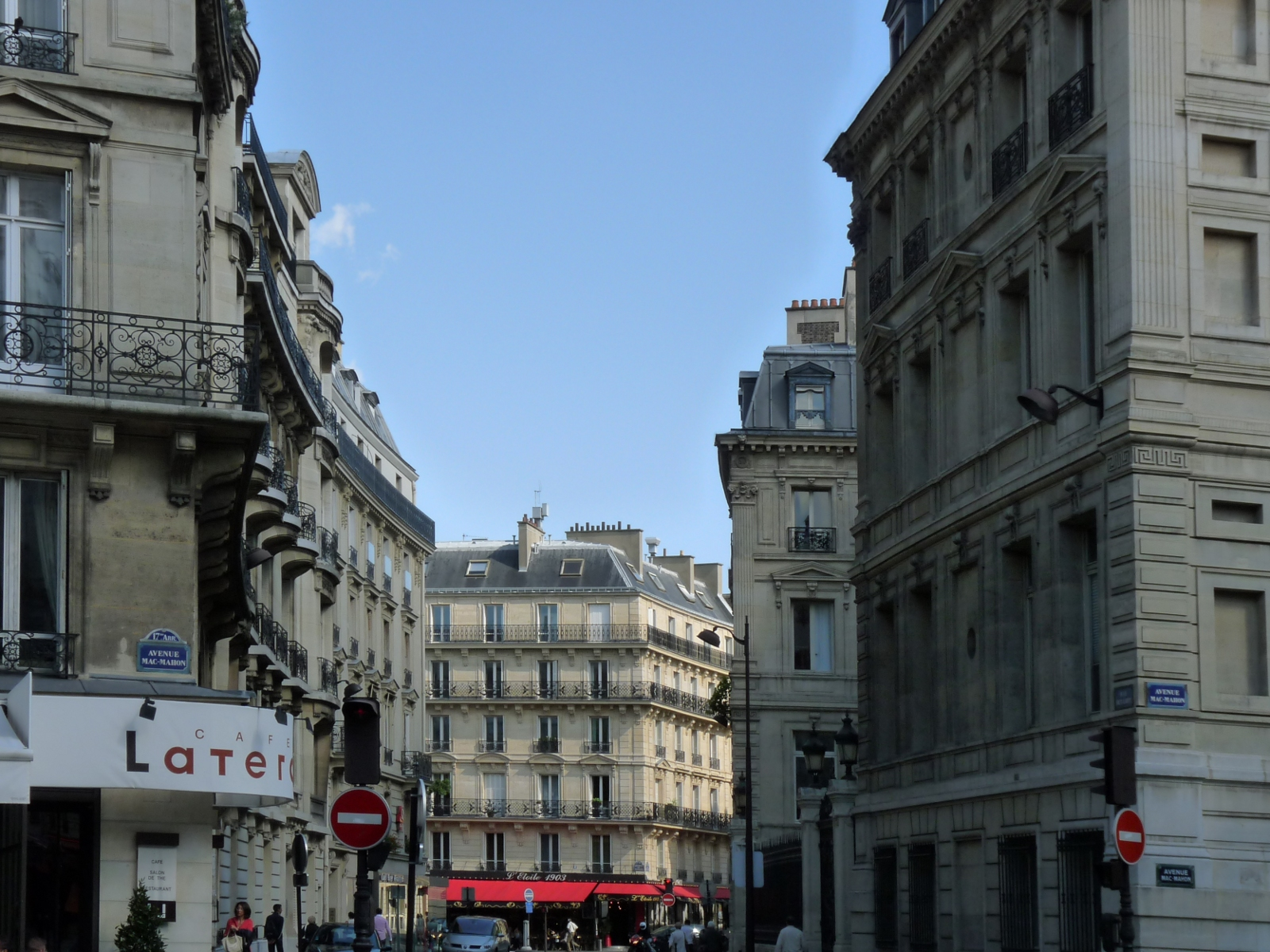

- Location within Paris
- Length: 460 m (1,510 ft)
- Width: 12 m (39 ft)
- Arrondissement: 8th, 17th
- Quarter: Faubourg-du-Roule, Ternes
- Coordinates: 48°52′31″N 2°17′43″E
- From: 154 Champs-Élysées
- To: 2 avenue de la Grande-Armée

Construction
- Completion: 1670
- Denomination: 2 March 1864

The Rue de Tilsitt is a street in the 8th and 17th arrondissements of Paris. It is one of two streets which form a circle around the Place de l’Étoile (renamed the Place Charles de Gaulle in 1970) - the other is the Rue de Presbourg. It was named after the Peace of Tilsit by a decree of 2 March 1864 (its spelling with the two final "t"s reflects old German spellings, which tended to double terminal consonants after short vowels).

The Embassy of Belgium in Paris is located on the Rue de Tilsitt.
