= Valtesse de La Bigne =

French stage actor and writer

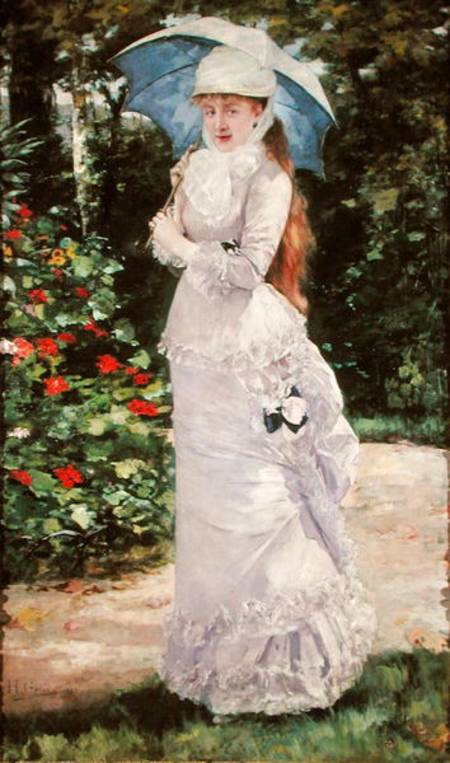
- Valtesse de La Bigne, by Henri Gervex, musée d'Orsay, Paris
- Born: Émilie-Louise Delabigne; 1848; Paris, France
- Died: 29 July 1910; Ville-d'Avray, France
- Occupations: Courtesan, actress, art collector

Émilie-Louise Delabigne, known as Countess Valtesse de La Bigne (1848, in Paris – 29 July 1910, in Ville-d'Avray), was an elite French courtesan and demi-mondaine who rose through the social ranks to mix with Paris's most glamorous elite. Although born to a working-class family in Paris, she built a life for herself and became a muse to artists like Henri Gervex, Édouard Manet, as well as novelist Émile Zola. Beyond her career as a courtesan, she was also an actress, an art collector, and salonnière.

== Early life ==
One of six siblings, Émilie-Louise was the daughter of an alcoholic father and Émilie Delabigne, a laundry maid from Normandy who was also involved in sex work. Her parents' employment was unreliable. Consequently, Delabigne joined the workforce at an early age to help support her family. She started work at a Paris sweet shop at the age of 10, then continued on to a dress shop at age 13. Her family's financial distress prevented her from gaining a formal education. Alongside her work at the dress shop, she spent many days observing and modeling for the painter Jean-Baptiste-Camille Corot, whose studio was in the arrondissement of Paris where she lived.

=== Entry into prostitution ===
For Delabigne, everything changed after she was raped in the street by an older man while on her way to work at the dress shop. In her biography, she explains how this violation transformed her outlook on the world: "The illusions, naive aspirations, hopes and dreams of my childhood, it was all gone in an instant because a brutal passerby had taken advantage of my gullibility, and society became my cruelest enemy."

In 19th-century Paris prostitution was rampant, often representing a desperate attempt to mitigate the brutalities of poverty and low wages paid to women. Delabigne quickly became a lorette or mistress, a role that was above the lower-class streetwalker but below the status of the courtesan. She met her lovers by attending dances at the Bal Mabille on Sundays and working in a women's underwear shop on the Champ-de-Mars, which was frequented by high-ranking officers.

=== Entry into acting ===
At the age of 16, she fell in love with the 20-year-old Richard Fossey, which propelled her to pursue a career as an actress. She began to star in a variety of plays, using her unusual charm and beauty to build a reputation in the industry.

While still unmarried, she had two children with Fossey (Julia Pâquerette Fossey, 3 March 1868, and Valérie Fossey, ca.1869). Fossey's father refused to condone a marriage between Fossey and Delabigne and in order to break them up he sent Fossey to Algeria, where Fossey eventually married another woman.

== Career as actress and courtesan ==
The breakup with Fossey catapulted Delabigne back into a life of sex work with new ambitions to conquer Paris. Willing to do whatever it took to become successful, she promised herself to never marry but instead gain money and social position by other means. Delabigne chose to prioritize her financial security and to sacrifice being involved with her children's lives.

To forge a stronger reputation and name for herself, she took the pseudonym "Valtesse" due to its similarity to "Votre Altesse" (your highness)— she later advised her friend (and possible lover) Anne-Marie Chassaigne (now known as Liane de Pougy) to employ a pseudonym as well. She aspired to join the ranks of the "archidrôlesses," or elite courtesans.

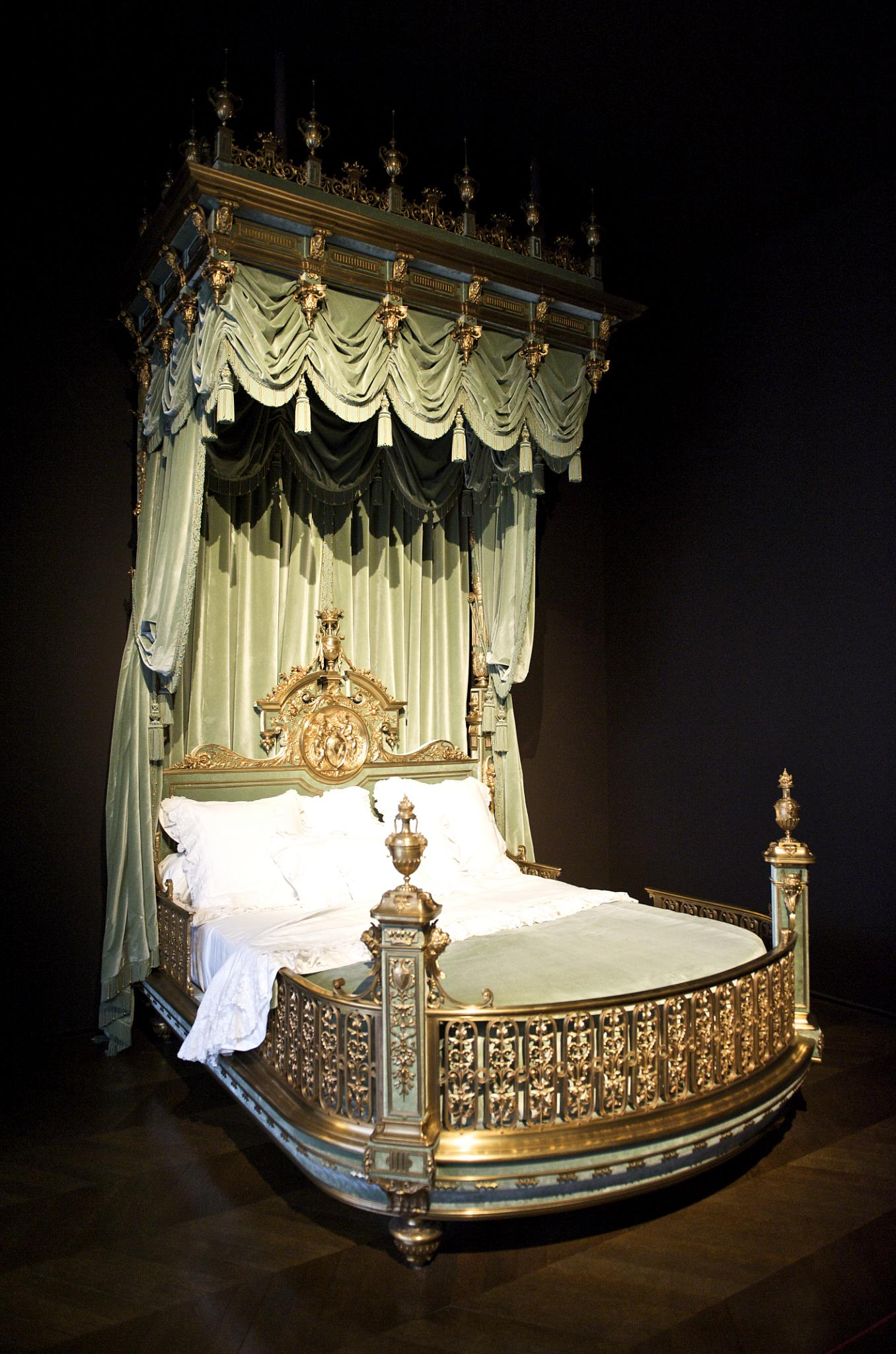
The bed designed by Édouard Lièvre, currently exhibited in the Valtesse de La Bigne room at the Musée des Arts Décoratifs, Paris.

=== "Courtisane du Tout-Paris" ===
Valtesse's beauty caught the eye of composer Jacques Offenbach and he promoted her through his operas. Offenbach brought Valtesse to public attention with a small role as Hébé in Orphée aux Enfers at the Bouffes-Parisiens. One critic deemed her "as red and timid as a virgin by Titian." She went on to act in minor parts in Le Fifre enchanté, as Saturnin in La chanson de Fortunio, as Berthe in La Diva, and as a page in La princesse de Trébizonde. Her first major role was Mistress Johnson in La Romance de la Rose, in which she sang.

She became the composer's mistress and frequented fashionable restaurants such as Bignon (the former 'Café Foy') and the Café Tortoni, where she met important contemporary novelists like Zola, Flaubert, and Maupassant. Even the starvation of the siege of Paris did not dampen her aspirations – in the tumult of the period, she refashioned herself into pseudo-aristocracy by altering her last name Delabigne to the Normandy-noble "de la Bigne" as well as adopting the title "Comtesse."

At the end of the war, Valtesse left Offenbach and became attached to Prince Lubomirski, who installed her in an apartment in rue Saint-Georges. She would have a succession of other rich lovers, such as Prince de Sagan, who built her a hôtel particulier (grand town house) designed by Jules Février from 1873 to 1876 at 98 Boulevard Malesherbes, at the corner of rue de la Terrasse (destroyed and replaced by a residential block in 1904). Alexandre Dumas fils allegedly asked to enter her bedroom, but she rejected his advances, saying, "Dear sir, it's not within your means!"

She nicknamed herself, "rayon d'or," or golden ray, and immersed herself in art and literature. She bought a sumptuous house at Ville-d'Avray, which she decorated with paintings commissioned from Édouard Detaille showing fictional members of her invented "la Bigne" family.

A neighbor of French politician Léon Gambetta in Ville-d'Avray, she asked to meet him. Although a Bonapartist, she argued that France should keep Tonkin — she knew its geopolitics via a correspondence with a former lover, Alexandre de Kergaradec, French consul in Hanoï, who had also sent her several gifts, including a large pagoda. On 9 June 1885, France recognized the French protectorate over Annam and Tonkin.

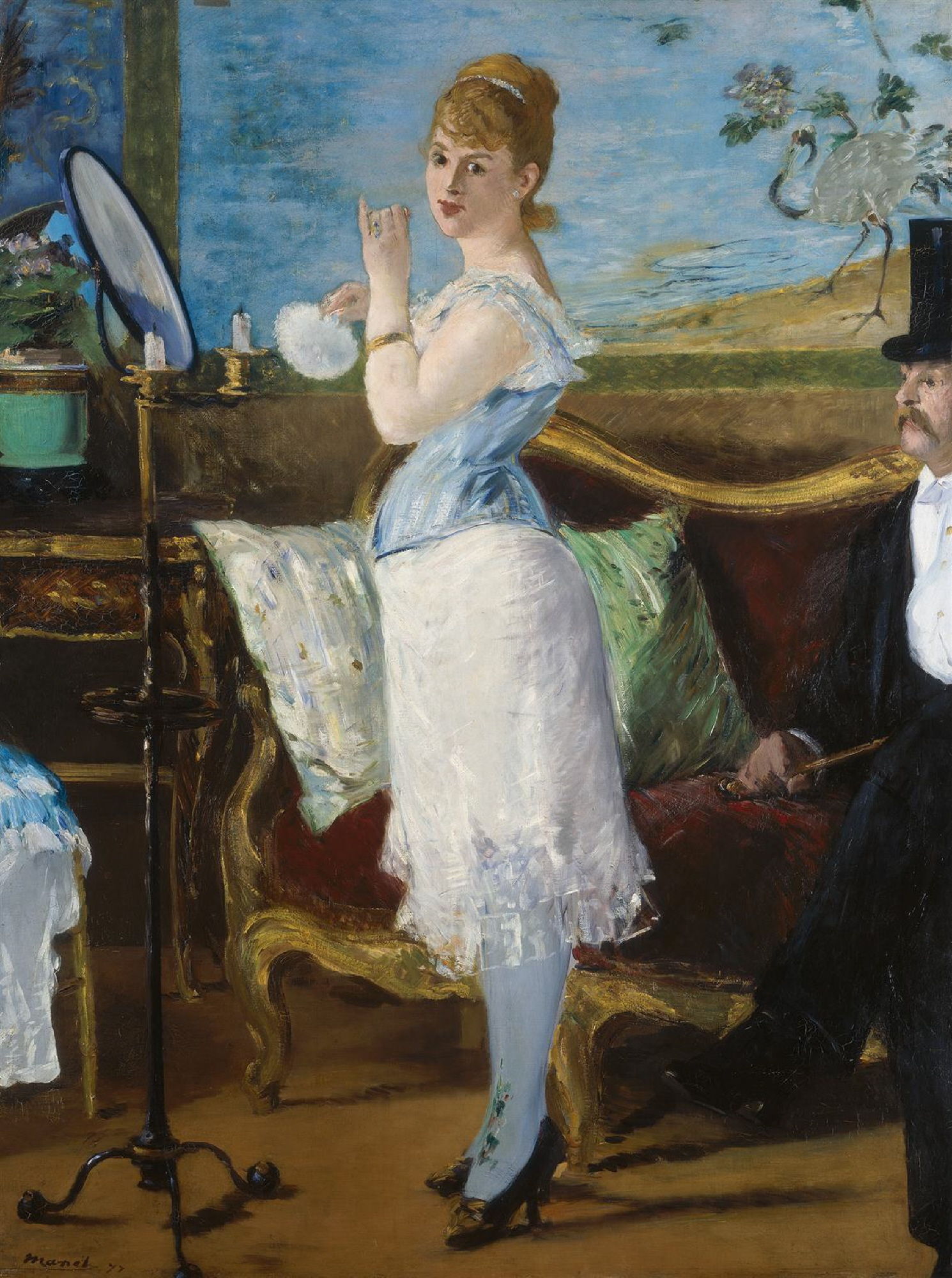
Édouard Manet's Nana, 1877, based on the character invented by Zola. Zola was heavily inspired by Valtesse for his titular character.

=== As a literary inspiration ===
The novelist Émile Zola mined the lives of Paris's elite courtesans for his novel Nana. He interviewed Ludovic Halévy, Offenbach's librettist, for details of Valtesse's life. At the request of Léon Hennique, she showed Zola around her hôtel particulier. Her bedchamber and bed were the inspiration for those in his novel Nana, which describes them: "A bed such as has never existed, a throne, an altar where Paris came to admire her sovereign nudity [...]. Along its sides, a band of cupids among flowers who look on and smile, watching the pleasures in shadows of the curtains." When she read the novel, Valtesse was indignant to find her decor described as revealing "some traces of tender foolishness and gaudy splendour"— and called the character of Nana "a vulgar whore, stupid, rude!"

She also inspired the heroine of La Nichina, a novel by Hugues Rebell, and the character Altesse in her friend and lover Liane de Pougy's novel Idylle saphique. She was friends with writers including Octave Mirbeau, Arsène Houssaye, Pierre Louÿs, Théophile Gautier, and Edmond de Goncourt, inspiring his Chérie.

=== As an author ===
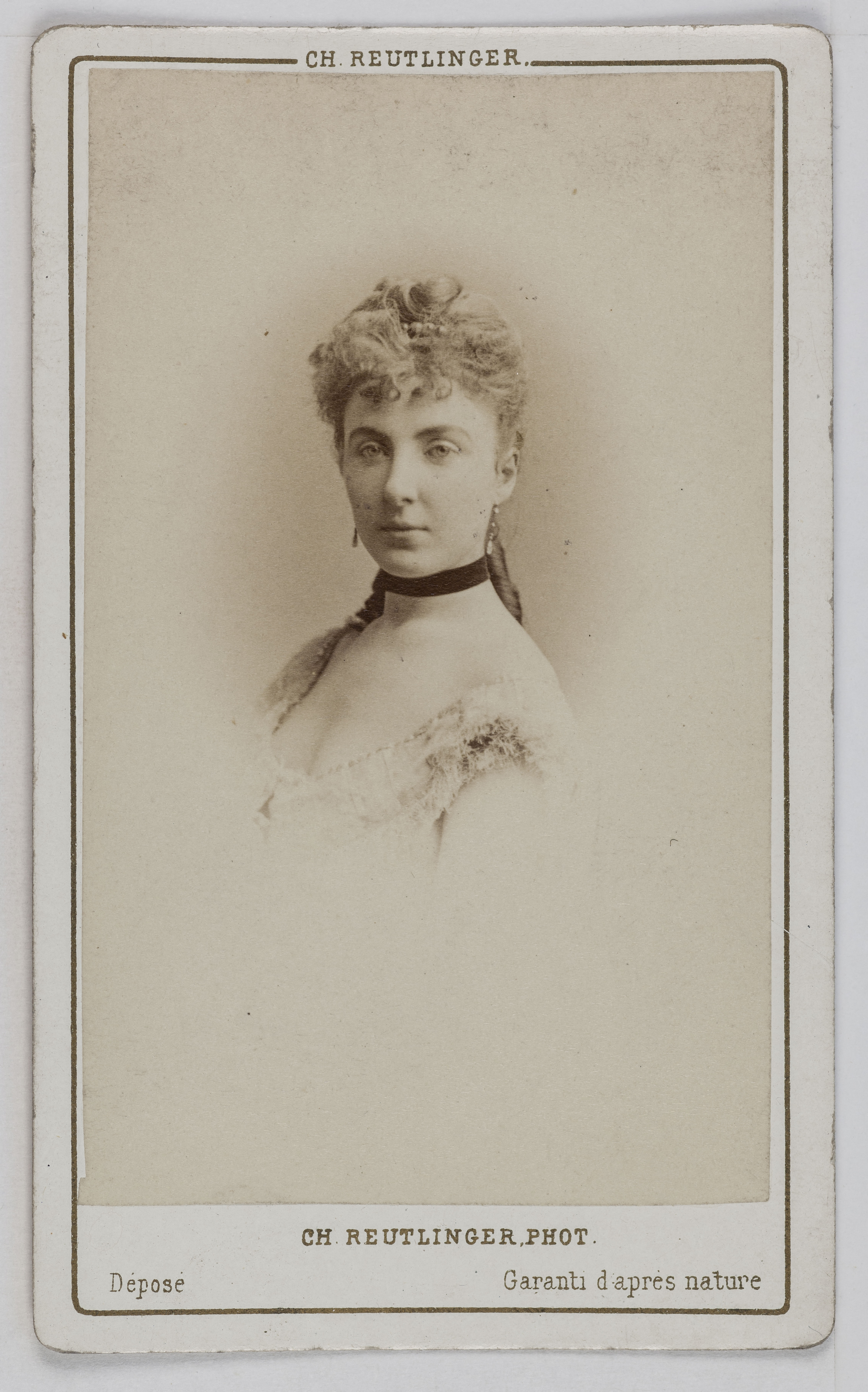
Portrait of Valtesse de La Bigne (1848-1910)

In 1876 de la Bigne published an autobiographical novel entitled Isola, signed "Ego" (her motto)— it was not a major success. It did, however, generate quite a buzz. De la Bigne had looked to the memoirs of the courtesan Céleste de Chabrillan (published under the pseudonym Mogador) for inspiration.

== Friendship with artists ==
Since her early days in the studio of Corot, Valtesse always had felt a connection to art, which she maintained as her social position changed, and her wealth grew. She began to collect art and both host and attend salons popular with artists. Salons were an elite social gathering where intellectual discussions about art, politics, and culture were held.

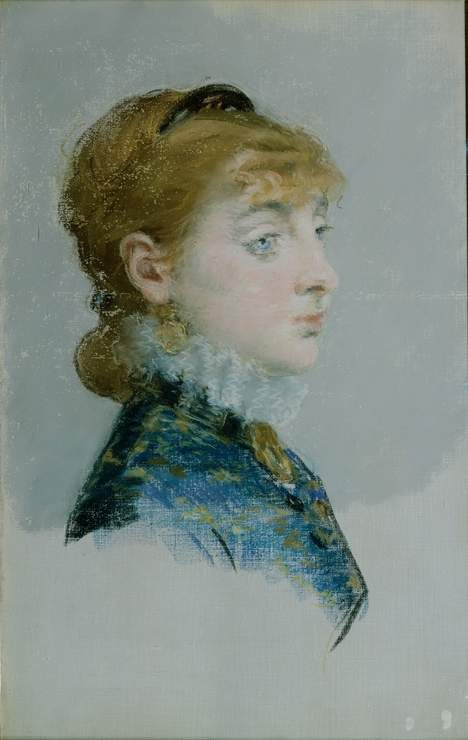
Valtesse de La Bigne, portrait by Édouard Manet, 1879.

Édouard Manet was among the prominent artists she became friendly with. He created portrait of Valtesse in pastel in 1879. Manet portrayed Valtesse regally, in a manner that highlighted her beauty and enhanced her public image. Impressionists like Manet were known for emphasizing popular fashion trends and accessories of the time period, and Valtesse's portrait is a prime example of this. Valtesse wears a high-collared blue dress with a stiff white ruff collar, gold pendant earrings and a matching brooch. The blue dress is her signature color and accentuates her red-golden hair and blue eyes.

Along with Manet, Valtesse had friendly relationships with many other artists, including Henri Gervex, Édouard Detaille, Gustave Courbet, Eugène Boudin, and Alphonse de Neuville, many of whom painted her. These relationships earned her the nickname "Union des Peintres." In 1879, she posed for a portrait by Gervex, wearing a pale lilac high-collared dress with a fashionable parasol. She also posed for the courtesan figure in Civil Marriage, which decorated the marriage room in the mairie of Paris's 19th arrondissement. Valtesse likely also served as the model for Gervex's La Toilette (1878).

She amassed a vast art collection, later sold by auction between 2 and 7 June 1902 at the Hôtel Drouot. She left her massive bronze bed (created in 1877 by Édouard Lièvre) to the Musée des Arts Décoratifs, Paris, where it is still on display.

== Personal life ==
Valtesse de La Bigne had a difficult relationship with her family. She entrusted her two children from her relationship with Fossey to her mother's care, who later took them to live in the countryside. When her younger daughter died while in her mother's care, Valtesse won back custody of her remaining daughter and placed her into a Catholic boarding school. Her mother, bitter at her loss of regular income for providing childcare, assaulted de La Bigne's housekeeper, Camille Meldola. Unfortunately, Valtesse's relationship with her sister, Emilie Delabigne Tremblay, was similarly turbulent. Emilie worked as a madam with a brothel on the Rue Blanche and called herself "Marquesse." In the early 1880s, Valtesse accused her mother and sister of attempting to draw Valtesse's daughter, Julia-Pâquerette, into sex work.

Later in life she built the villa of Les Aigles in Monte-Carlo, and sold her hôtel particulier on boulevard Malesherbes, whereupon she mainly lived in Ville-d'Avray until her death at age 62.

De la Bigne wrote her own death announcement, stating, "One must love a little or a lot, following nature, but quickly, during an instant, as one loves a birdsong which speaks to one's soul and which one forgets with its last note, as one loves the crimson hues of the sun at the moment when it disappears below the horizon." She was buried in the town cemetery with two men: Commander Louis Marius Auriac and an unknown "E. Luna."

Valtesse's daughter, Julia Pâquerette, went on to marry Paul Jules August Godard and had three children: Paul, Margot, and Andrée. Liane de Pougy served as Margot's godmother. Like her grandmother, Andrée got her start in the theatre. She started acting in New York in the early 1920s, going by the name Andrée Lafayette.

== Bibliography ==
- Catherine Hewitt, The Mistress of Paris: The 19th-Century Courtesan Who Built an Empire on a Secret, London, Icon Books, 2015, 320 pages, ISBN 978-184831-926-4.
- Yolaine de La Bigne, Valtesse de La Bigne ou le pouvoir de la volupté, Paris, Librairie académique Perrin, 1999, 244 pages, ISBN 2-702834-76-0.
