= Le mari de la reine =

Opérette in three acts

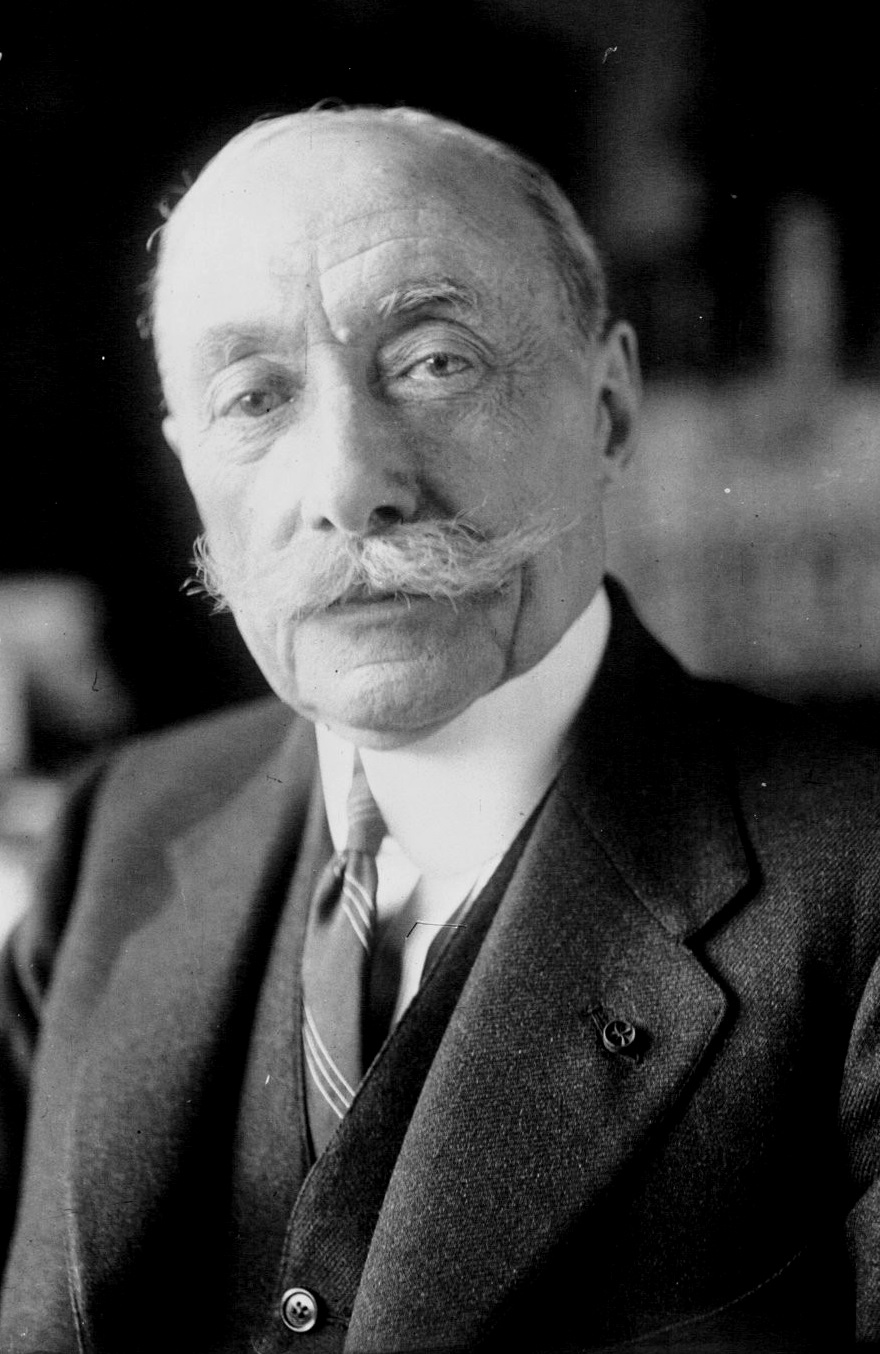
André Messager, 1921

Le mari de la reine is an opérette in three acts of 1889, with music by André Messager and a French libretto by Ernest Grenet-Dancourt and Octave Pradels.

It was first performed at the Bouffes-Parisiens on 18 December 1889, with a vocal score being published in the following year. Messager described it as "the best of my failures".

== Roles ==
Role	Voice type	Premiere Cast, 18 December 1889 (Conductor: André Messager)
Patouillard	tenor	Montrouge
Florestan	baritone	Albert-Alexandre Piccaluga
Le roi Yacoub	tenor	Fernand Tauffenberger
Tomba-Kopo	bass	Pierre Gailhard
Marchand d’esclaves		Dupré
Le Nègre		Valery
Justine Patouillard	soprano	Mily-Meyer
La reine	soprano	Antonia-Louise Aussourd
Mme Patouillard	mezzo-soprano	Marguerite Macé-Montrouge
Maëva		Mlle Lafontaine
Zetulbe		Mlle Demareuil
Sophia		Mlle Derieu
Damar		Mlle Flore
Isaelli		Mlle Marion
Zulma		Mlle de Nelsonn
Dinelha		Mlle Clément
Djalma		Mlle Meryem

== Synopsis ==
Florestan, a young artist, has asked for the hand of Justine Patouillard. The Patouillards, who have a restaurant at 18 rue Rambuteau, have refused him flat. Rejected and disheartened, Florestan goes to seek his fortune in 'Kokistan', supposedly on a mission for Geoffroy Saint-Hilaire. After a couple of minutes of conversation, Tomba-Kopo, the prime minister, explains the strange situation to the visitor. The local law means that the queen is obliged to get divorced every year, and take as a new husband (old ones can also re-apply) he who has hunted down the sacred deer. With not much else to do, Florestan puts himself forward in the ranks of those seeking to wed Asella, the very acceptable young sovereign. The out-going spouse, Yacoub, with whom Asella has been perfectly satisfied, and Tomba-Kopo himself, who preceded him, are to be the most serious competitors – the first for this strength, the second because of his cunning.

It is with this background that Monsieur and Madame Patouillard set out for Kokistan, escorted by their daughter, inconsolable since the departure of her loved one, in order to find Florestan and marry Justine with him. Justine’s joy at finding her Florestan soon turns sour when she learns that her fiancé has enrolled in the list of the queen's suitors, and even worse that he is returning victorious from the trial, to become the "mari de la reine". This pleases neither Asella nor Justine. To sort matters out it is decided to set the law to one side so that Asella can get back Yacoub, and Florestan marries Justine...
