= Bernicat =

Bernicat is a surname. Notable people with the surname include:

- Firmin Bernicat (1842–1883), French operetta composer
- Marcia Bernicat (born 1953), American diplomat
