= Avenue Montaigne =

Street in Paris, France

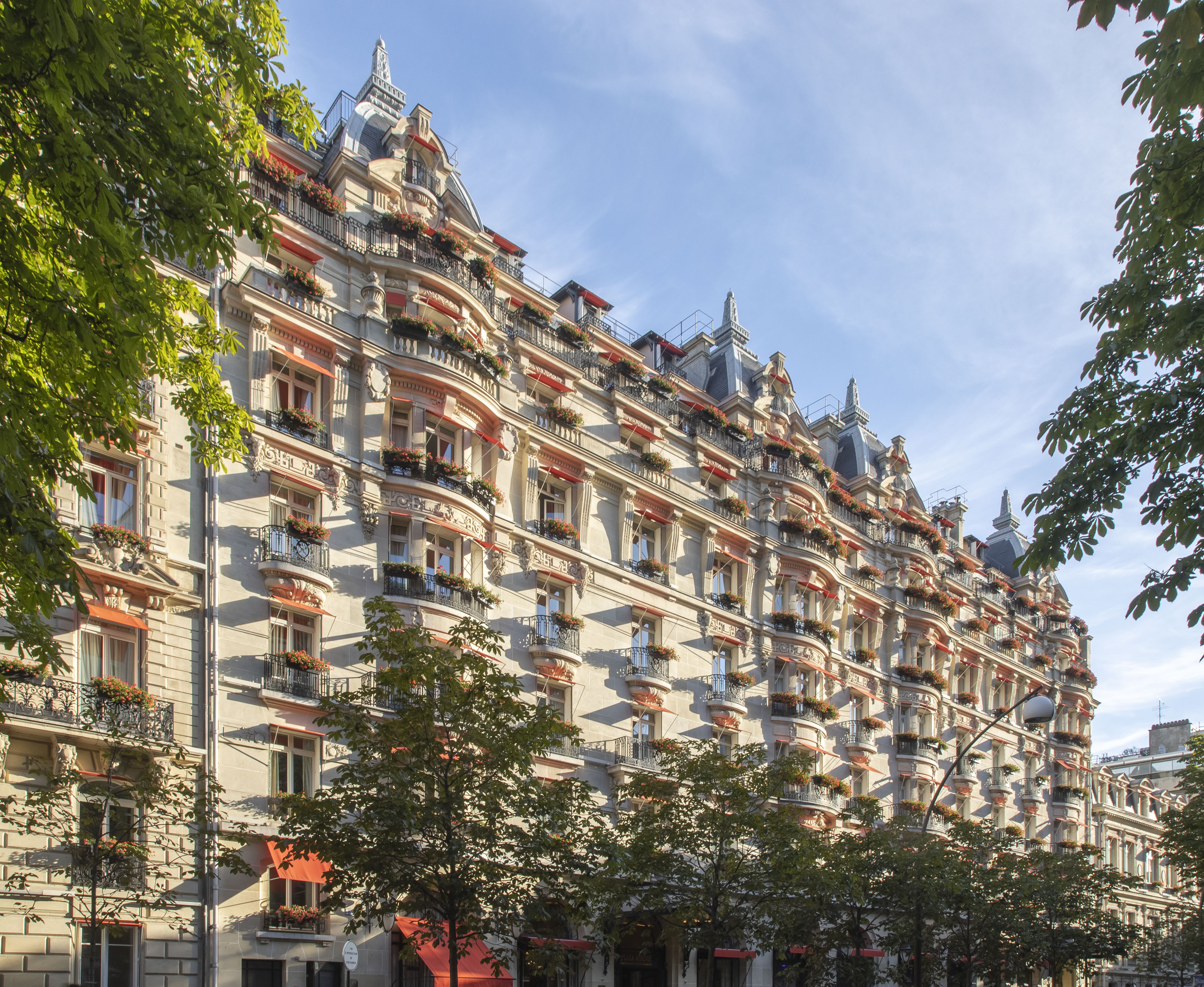
- The Plaza Athénée hotel at 23–27, Avenue Montaigne

- Location within Paris
- Length: 615 m (2,018 ft)
- Width: 33 m (108 ft)
- Arrondissement: 8th
- Quarter: Champs-Élysées
- Coordinates: 48°52′00″N 2°18′22″E
- From: 7, Place de l'Alma
- To: 3, Rond-Point des Champs-Élysées

Construction
- Completion: Before 1672
- Denomination: 13 July 1850

The Avenue Montaigne (French: [avəny mɔ̃tɛɲ]) is a street in the 8th arrondissement of Paris, France.

== Origin of the name ==
The Avenue Montaigne was originally called the Allée des Veuves ("Widows' Alley") because women in mourning gathered there, but the street has changed much since those days of the early 18th century. The present name comes from Michel de Montaigne, a writer of the French Renaissance. In the 19th century, the street earned some renown for its sparkling and colourful Bal Mabille (Mabille Gardens) on Saturday nights.

== Fashion ==
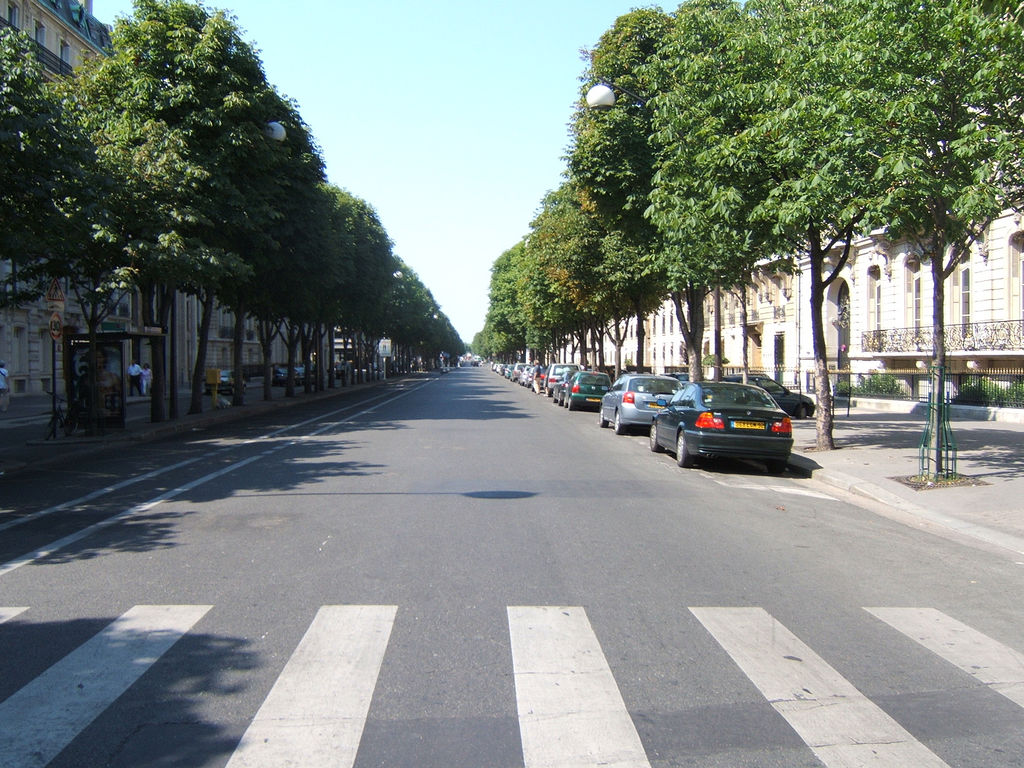
Avenue Montaigne

The Avenue Montaigne has numerous stores specialising in high fashion, such as Louis Vuitton, Dior, Chanel, Fendi, Valentino, Ralph Lauren, Yves Saint Laurent, Gucci, Chanel, Prada, Chloe, Giorgio Armani, Versace and Dolce & Gabbana, as well as jewellers like Bulgari and other upscale establishments such as the prestigious Plaza Athénée hotel.

By the 1980s, the Avenue Montaigne was considered to be la grande dame of French streets for high fashion and accessories, and is now considered more important than the Rue du Faubourg Saint Honoré. Several established clothing designers set up here, particularly the LVMH (Moët Hennessey Louis Vuitton) group. LVMH brought investment and international attention to the street, and its stable of top designers and firms, such as Céline, Louis Vuitton, Inès de la Fressange and formerly Christian Lacroix, own a substantial portfolio of the street's real estate.

In 2009, the Comité Montaigne presided over by Jean-Claude Cathalan launched a website with an interactive map.

== Other uses ==
- The Canadian Embassy was previously located at 35, Avenue Montaigne.
- Actress Marlene Dietrich maintained an apartment at 12, Avenue Montaigne for many years; she died there in 1992.
- During her last years, Soraya Esfandiary-Bakhtiary lived at 46, Avenue Montaigne.

== Monument ==
At 15, Avenue Montaigne stands the Théâtre des Champs-Élysées.

== History ==
=== Paris 1855 ===
The pavilion for the arts display of the Exposition Universelle (1855) was on the Avenue Montaigne.

=== Paris 1913 ===
In 1913, the Avenue Montaigne got both the Theatre des Champs Elysees and the Plazza Athenee hotel which created its fame.

=== Jewellery robberies ===
On 4 December 2008, the Harry Winston boutique at no. 29 was robbed of more than €80 million (about US$100 million) worth of "diamond rings, necklaces and luxury watches" by a "gang of three or four" armed men just before closing. At least two of the thieves were men wearing "wigs and women's clothes." It had also been robbed in October 2007, when a similar heist netted the robbers about €20 million.
