= François les bas-bleus =

Opéra comique in three acts

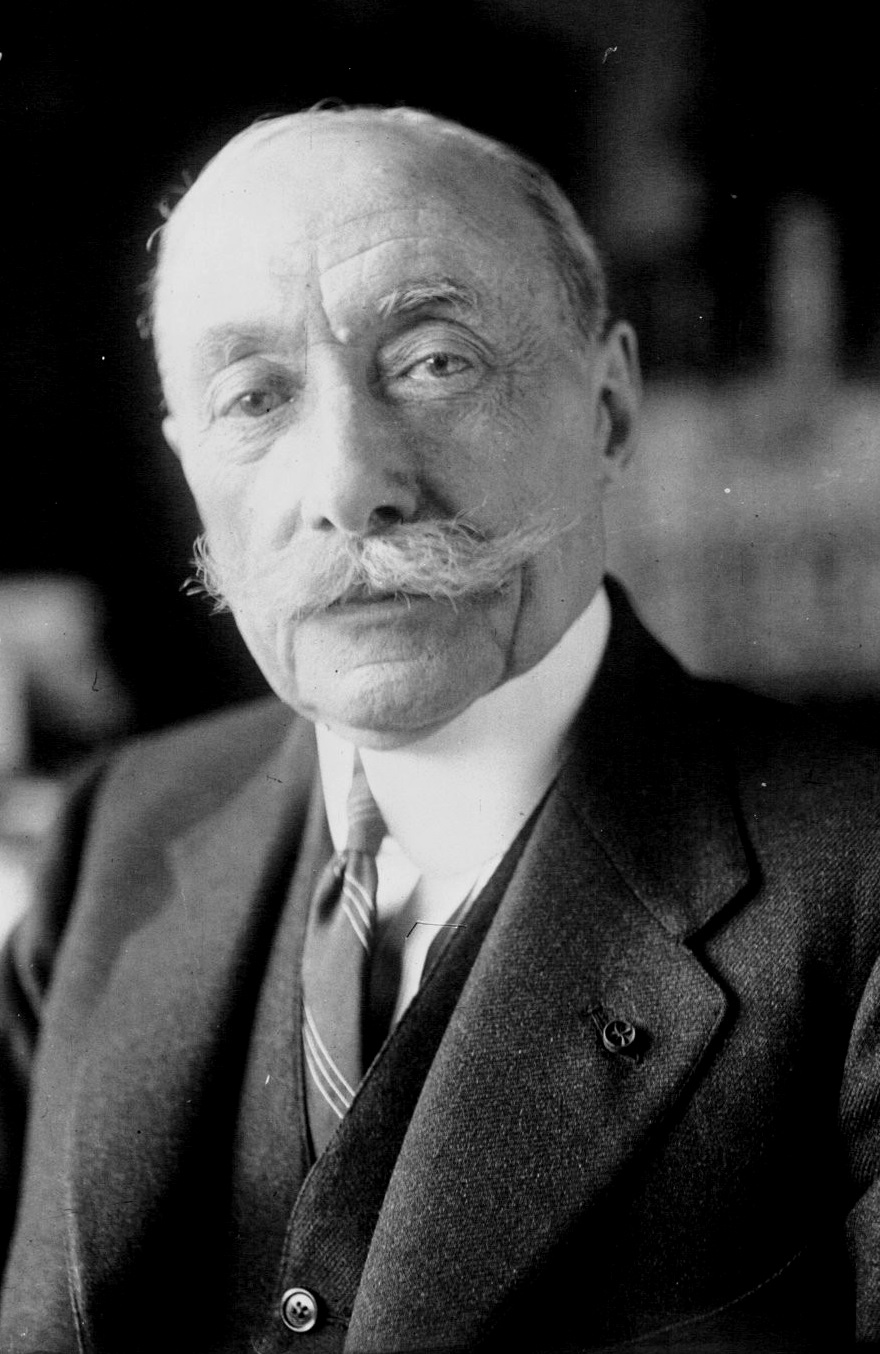
André Messager, 1921

François les bas-bleus is an opéra comique in three acts of 1883, with a French libretto by Ernest Dubreuil, Eugène Humbert, Paul Burani, and music by Firmin Bernicat, completed by André Messager.

== Background ==
Bernicat had worked for some time in café-concert; he began work setting a libretto based on an old vaudeville Les beignets à la cour, which became an opéra-comique in three acts Les beignets du roi and was mounted at the Théâtre des Fantaisies-Parisiennes in Brussels in February 1882, with some success.

François les bas-bleus was first performed at the Théâtre des Folies-Dramatiques on 8 November 1883, and continued to play there until the following March. From 17 December 1887 it was revived at the Théâtre des Menus-Plaisirs for 50 performances, with Jane Pierny as Fanchon, Jacquin as François, Bartel as Pontcornet and Alice Berthier as the comtesse de la Savonnière. In October 1896 the Folies-Dramatiques revived it with Jean Périer in the title role. The work was staged at the Théâtre des Bouffes-Parisiens on 17 January 1900 for a further 36 performances, with Périer again and Anne Tariol-Baugé as Fanchon.

== Roles ==
Role	Voice type	Premiere Cast, 8 November 1883 (Conductor: Pascal Delagarde)
François les bas-bleus	baritone	Max Bouvet
Marquis de Pontcornet	tenor	Montrouge
Chevalier de Lansac	tenor	Dekernel
Kirschwasser		Darman
Jasmin	bass	Bartel
Courtalin		Jules Speck
Gratinet		Ambroise
Fanchon	soprano	Jeanne Andrée
La comtesse de la Savonnière	soprano	Mme d'Harville
Militza	soprano	Mlle Pauseron
Nicolet		Destrées
Juliette		Mlle Falsonn

== Synopsis ==
The opera takes place in Paris in 1789.
François les Bas-Bleus, friend of all sweethearts, is a letter-writer at the Carrefour Saint-Eustache, and in love with Fanchon, a street-singer. The marriage of the two would be quite straightforward, were it not that Fanchon decides to sing to François, a childhood birthday song, which instantly identifies her to the passing comtesse de la Savonnière. Without a doubt, this Fanchon is the child of the marquis de Pontcornet, raised in a circus. Fanchon's aunt, is also in love with François les Bas-Bleus, and will do everything to prevent the wedding of her niece with the man whom she loves. But Fanchon has spirit – she refuses to wed her cousin, de Lansac, and remains loyal to François, imprisoned in the Bastille with the Marquis de Pontcornet, for whom he has so clearly written a song that he made it too progressive.
It is now the 14th of July; the Bastille is taken, the Marquis and François are soon rescued. One decides to become a cider merchant, the other a commander of the garde nationale. In this guise François gains the power over the marquis, arrested as a suspect, naturally, on condition that he allows him to marry his daughter: François and Fanchon wed and all ends happily.

The music contains a delightful writing-lesson duo, the song of François les Bas-Bleus, a waltz "Voici les roses", a Norman folksong "The little sailor" in the first Act. In the second, a love duet "Espérance en heureux jours" was enthusiastically received, while in the third Act the romance "A toi j'avais donné ma vie" was applauded.
