= Édouard Lièvre =

French painter

- Born: Édouard Lièvre; 22 September 1828
- Died: 26 November 1886 (aged 58)

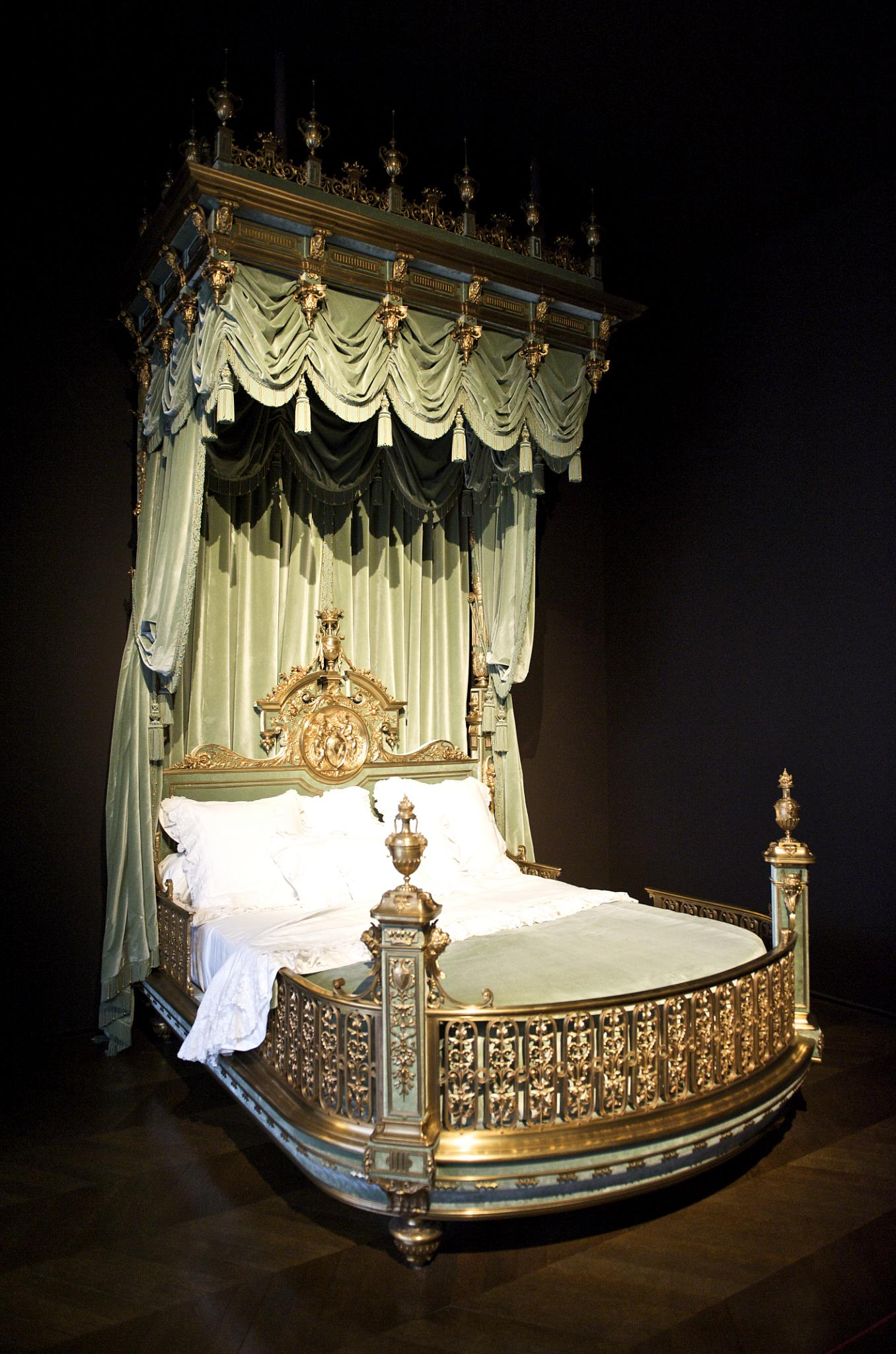
Bed designed by Lièvre.

Édouard Lièvre (22 September 1828 in Blamont – 26 November 1886 in Paris) was a French artist, painter, illustrator, cabinet maker, engraver and designer of ornamental art. He is most notable for the bed he designed in 1877 for the courtesan Valtesse de la Bigne. A lacquered rosewood Japanese-style cupboard by him in the form of a pagoda, with bronze lions and dragons writhing round columns, sold at Bonhams in London 12 December 2008 for £2,036,000,000, beating the world record for a 19th-century furniture item.
