= Montrouge (actor) =

French opera singer

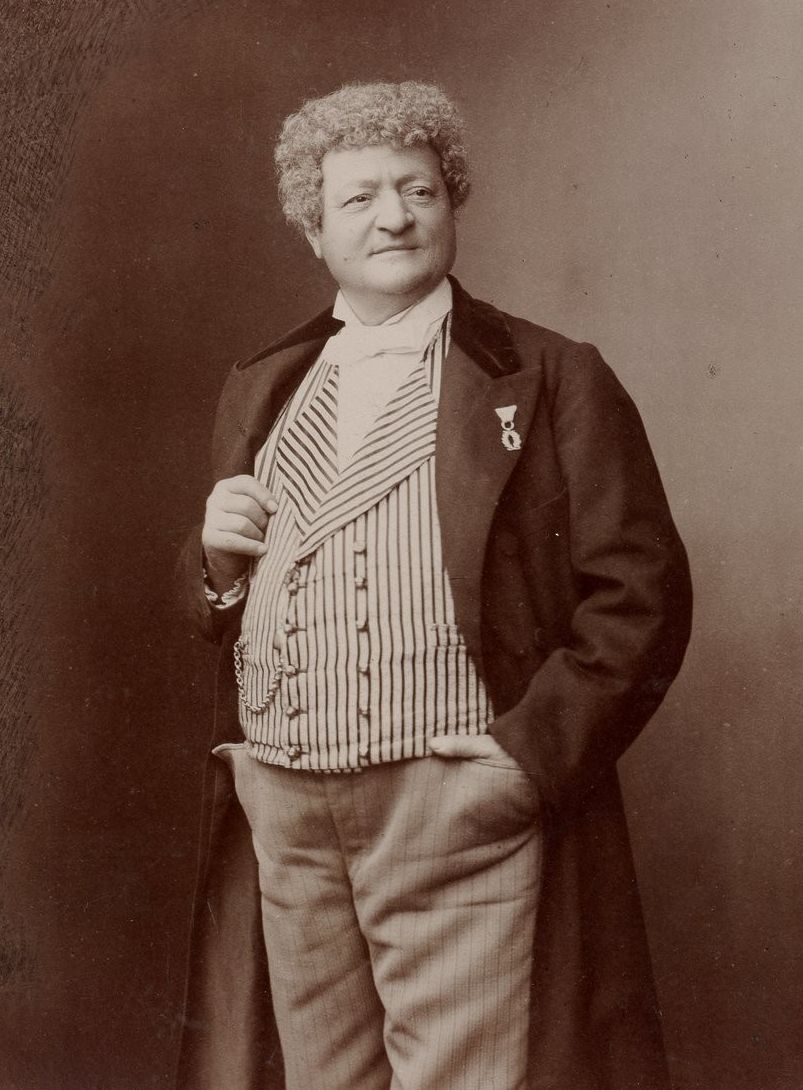
Montrouge in 1900

Montrouge (15 March 1825 – 22 December 1903), born Louis (Émile) Hesnard, was a comic actor in French musical theatre in the second half of the nineteenth century, as well as a theatre manager in Paris.

== Life and career ==
He studied architecture at the École des Beaux-Arts in Paris but then became involved in amateur theatre work.

Montrouge's career began in earnest in 1855 at the Théâtre Batignolles, where he also acted as manager. In addition he variously managed the Théâtre Folies-Marigny from 1864 to 1869 (where he met his wife, and on leaving received a benefit of 500,000 francs), the Théâtre des Bouffes-Parisiens, the Théâtre du Châtelet and the Athénée-Comique.

He performed together with his wife in Cairo from 1873 to 1875. At the Théâtre des Délassements-Comiques he developed the role of compère for stage revues, for which he became famous. After touring in Italy, Montrouge worked successively at the Théâtre des Folies-Dramatiques, the Théâtre des Variétés, the Théâtre de la Porte Saint-Martin and in Brussels.

In operetta his creations included:

- Capoulade in Le Testament de M Crac (1871)
- Baron in Le Droit du seigneur (1878)
- Pontcornet in François les bas-bleus (1883)
- Patouillard in Le Mari de la reine (1889)
- Smithson in Miss Helyett (1894)

In 1885 he took the part of Godet in the premiere run of Naufrage de M Godet and compered the revue Les Potins de Paris at the Théâtre des Variétés; in 1886 he was Commissaire Trousselet in Fiacre 117 and in 1887 Doyenné in Coup de foudre.

Montrouge sang in several revivals at the Bouffes Parisiens, including the Baron in Le Droit du seigneur, Laurent XVII in La mascotte, and Alfred Pharaon in Joséphine vendue par ses sœurs in 1889.

His wife was the actress and operetta singer Marguerite Macé-Montrouge whom he met while working at the Folies-Marigny.
