= Bal Mabille =

Coordinates: 48.86795°N 2.307546°E

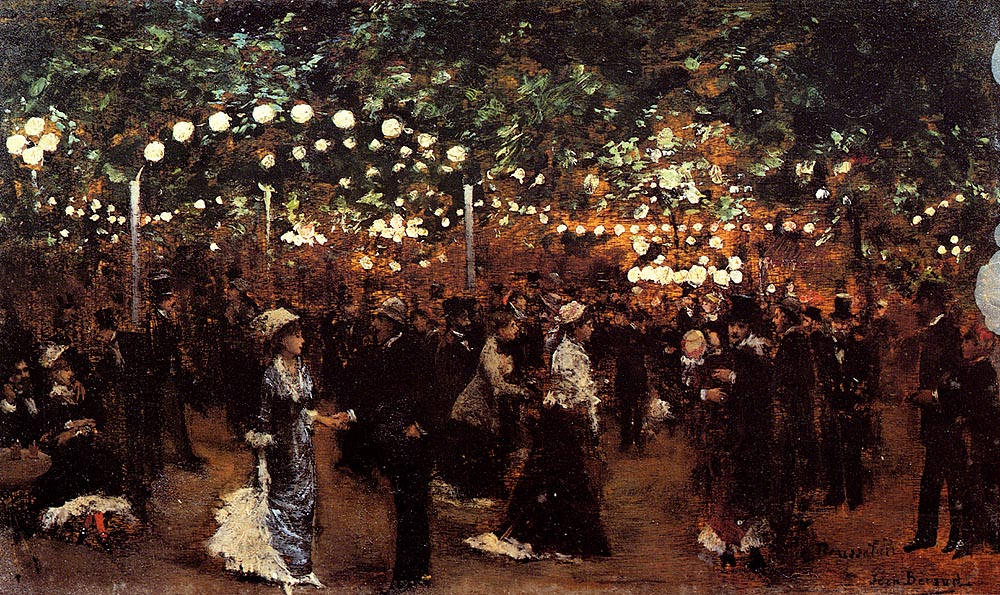
The Bal Mabille by Jean Béraud

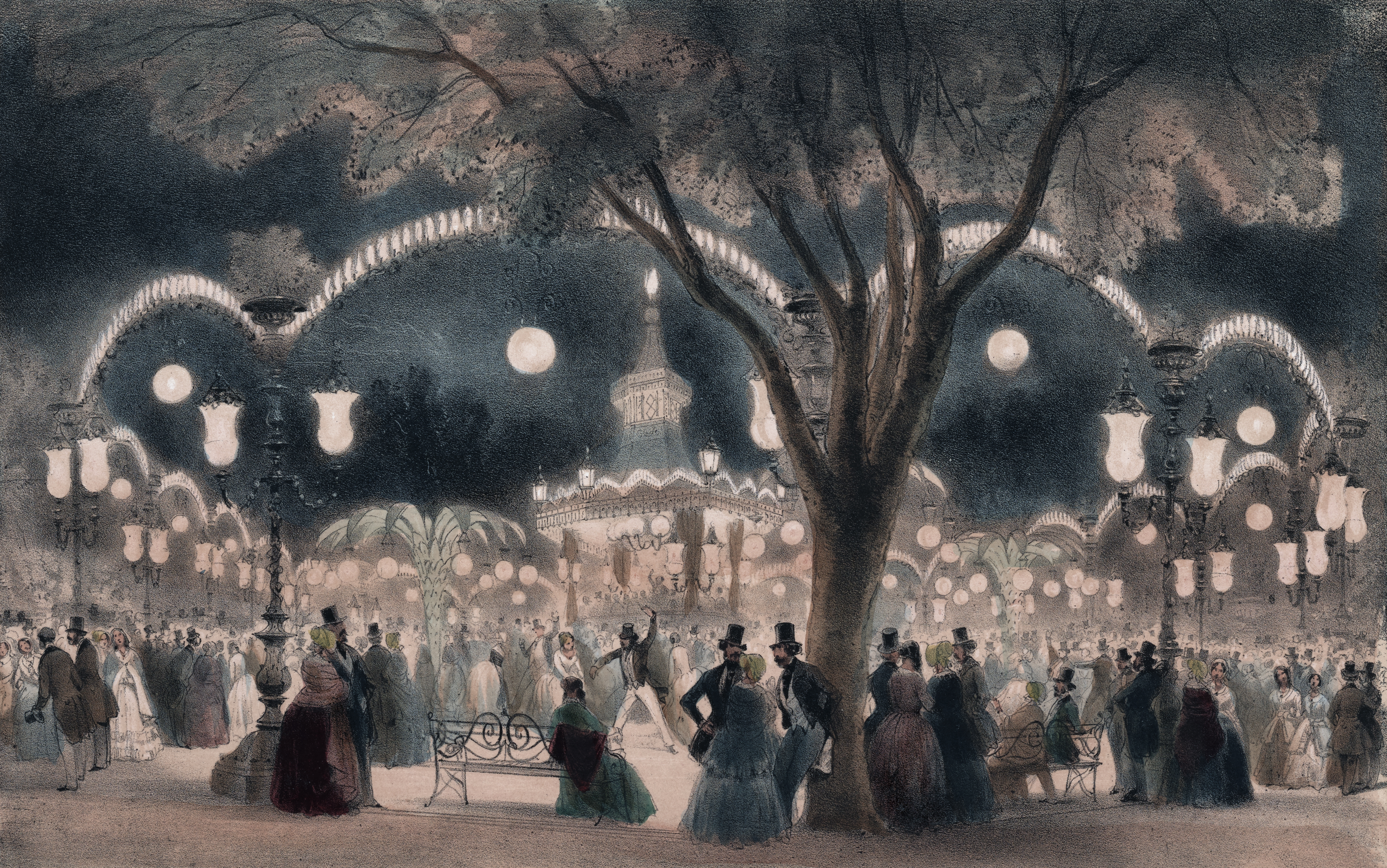
Bal Mabille in an 1858 lithograph

The Bal Mabille, also known as Jardin Mabille and Mabille Gardens in English, was a fashionable open-air dance establishment on what is now Avenue Montaigne in Faubourg Saint-Honoré, Paris, extending from 49 to 53 in the modern street numbering. It was opened in 1831, when the area was still largely rural, was struck by shells during the siege of Paris in 1870–71, and closed in 1875. Both the polka and the can-can were reportedly introduced there.

== History ==
The Bal Mabille was opened in 1831 by Monsieur Mabille, a dance instructor, and was originally only for his pupils. It was later opened to the public, and in 1844 his sons decided to refurbish it as a sort of enchanted garden, with sand paths, lawns, trees and shrubs, galleries and a grotto. It was equipped with 3,000 gas lamps, very modern for the time, and was thus able to stay open after dark. Coloured-glass globes illuminated the areas under trees, and strings of lights and chandeliers were suspended between them. There was an area with a roof for protection from rain, and the grounds contained a Chinese pavilion, artificial palm trees, and a merry-go-round. Charles Monselet described it as "gilded from top to bottom: trees, benches, vases, flowers ... nature glistening in gold, silver and precious stones".

The entrance price was high, so that only the relatively well to do were able to frequent the establishment. It soon became the most fashionable dancing location of the period, although it had a reputation for attracting more foreigners in search of "pretty faces" than Parisians. The garden had a reputation as a place for gentlemen to meet prostitutes. The polka was introduced there by Élise Rosita Sergent, known as la reine Pomaré, and Élisabeth-Céleste Vénard, known as "Céleste Mogador", and the can-can is said to have been invented there. Other noted dancers who appeared there during the Second Empire were Rigolboche and Rosalba. In 1870, in the siege of Paris during the Franco-Prussian War, the Bal Mabille was hit by shells. Under the Third Republic, there was a shooting range there, and a fifty-piece orchestra led by Olivier Métra.

It closed in 1875 and was demolished in 1882.

== In literature and popular culture ==
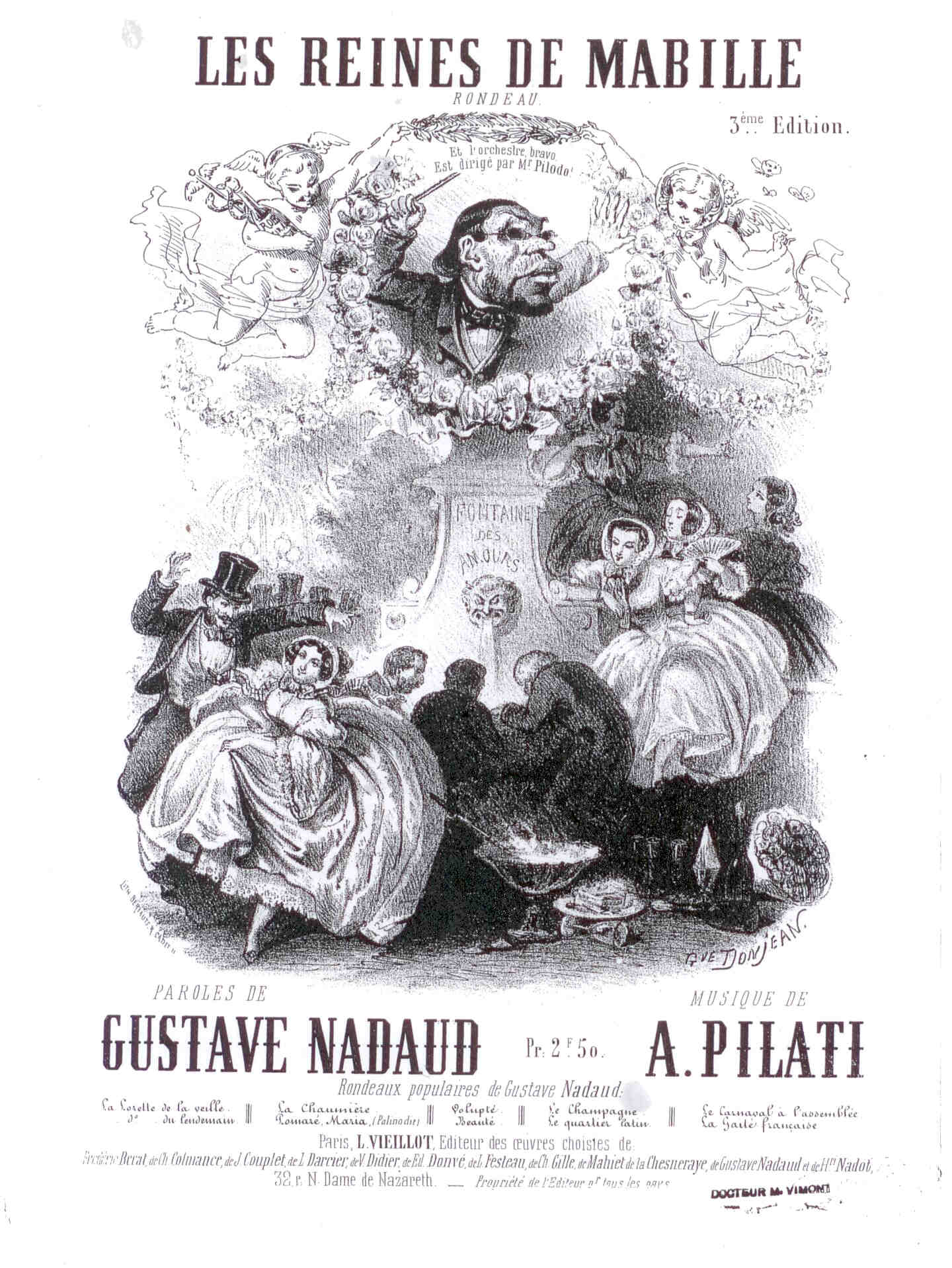
Cover of sheet music for "Les reines de Mabille", a song about the Bal Mabille composed by A. Pilati, with lyrics by Gustave Nadaud

Balzac mentions the Bal Mabille several times in La Comédie humaine as a place frequented by the kind of prostitute known at the time as a lorette, and a poem by Louis Aragon contains the line "Le secret de Paris n'est pas au bal Mabille" - "The secret of Paris is not in the Bal Mabille".

Gustave Nadaud wrote the lyrics for a song called "Les reines de Mabille" (The Queens of Mabille"), with music by A. Pilati. In a 1942 rewrite of Charles Lecocq's 1872 operetta Les cent vierges (The Hundred Virgins), it is the setting of the first act, which features a song about the can-canning there.

In Hans Christian Andersen's "The Wood Nymph: A Tale of the 1867 Paris Exposition," the main character is amazed by the "Mabile" garden and joins the wild dancing.

In Act I of Puccini’s famous opera La Bohème, set in Paris during the 1840s, the character Marcello tells his landlord, Benoît, that he’s seen him at the “Mabil” engaged in a “sin of love.”

Mark Twain describes a brief visit in his book The Innocents Abroad.

In Ralph Adams Cram's ghost story No. 252 Rue M. le Prince, published in1895 but set ten years earlier, the narrator tells a friend "Here

is a chance for you to do the honors of your city in a manner which is faultless. Show me a real live ghost, and I will forgive Paris for having lost the Jardin Mabille".

== Sources ==
- Gänzl, Kurt; Andrew Lamb (1988). Gänzl's Book of the Musical Theatre. London: The Bodley Head. OCLC 966051934.
