= Céleste Mogador =

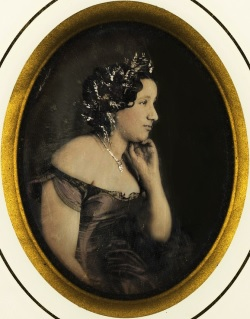
- Born: Élisabeth-Céleste Vénard; 27 December 1824; Paris, France
- Died: 18 February 1909 (aged 84); Montmartre, France

Élisabeth-Céleste Vénard, countess of Chabrillan (27 December 1824 – 18 February 1909), better known by her stage name Céleste Mogador and often referred to simply as Mogador, was a French dancer, courtesan, and writer.

== Life and career ==
=== Early life ===
Élisabeth-Céleste Vénard, the daughter of Anne-Victoire Vénard, was born in Paris, France, on 27 December 1824. She states in her autobiography that her father died when she was six; her book's translator Monique Fleury Nagem states that Celeste's father left her mother while she was pregnant and went off to join the army. Céleste's autobiography recounts her earliest memories, dominated by her mother's various lovers. At one point, a violent assault by her mother's lover nicknamed Monsieur G. forced them to flee Paris for their safety. Upon their return, they settled near the Boulevard du Temple, famed for its theaters. It was during this time that frequent visits to the theater with her mother inspired her to dream of becoming a stage actress. At age 11, she became an apprentice to a seamstress. Her mother later became involved with another lover, Vincent, whom she described as temperamental. Vincent attempted to rape Céleste when she was just 15 years old.

=== Brothel prostitute ===
Following the attempted rape, Céleste ran away from home. She spent four days wandering the streets waiting for her mother to return before she was rescued by a prostitute named Thérèse. She was later caught by the police and sent to a correction facility, Saint-Lazare, on charges of being under age and in company of a prostitute. In Saint-Lazare she made friends with Denise, another young prostitute, who convinced her that prostitution would grant her independence and riches. Of this conversation with Denise, she wrote: "All she had told me danced through my head all night. I saw myself rich, covered with jewels and lace. I looked in my little shard of mirror. I was truly pretty…” Upon leaving Saint-Lazare, dejected by her mother's inability to leave her lover and influenced by Denise's words, she decided to register herself as a prostitute. At 16, Céleste was the youngest age a girl could legally enter the profession.

In her autobiography she describes the hardships faced in the brothel and how she came to regret her decision to become a prostitute. During her short time there, she encountered many men who became both clients and lovers, including the poet Alfred de Musset who apparently humiliated her at a restaurant by dousing her with seltzer. At one point, she contracted smallpox and was hospitalized for many days. At the hospital, she met a Dr. Adolph whom she fell in love with. After this she decided to try her hand at singing and acting. At first, she faced many rejections and continued with sex work. Within 6 months of working in the brothel, Céleste left to become a dancer, though it took much longer for her name to be officially removed from the police registry of prostitutes.

=== Dancer and courtesan ===
She first established her name as a dancer at the Bal Mabille, one of the most popular dance halls in Paris at the time. She would visit the lively dance hall to watch the famous Élise Sergent, nicknamed Queen Pomaré, perform the polka with her dance partner Brididi. One night, Brididi noticed Céleste and asked her to dance. The following day she would dance the polka at the Mabille with Brididi, establishing her as Pomaré's rival. Spectators began to call them the rival queens of the Mabille. She wowed spectators with her dancing and it was at the Mabille where Brididi gave her the nickname la Mogador, referring to the 1844 bombardment of Mogador in Morocco, now known as Essaouira. Having to fend off interested suitors for his partner, Brididi exclaimed: "It would be easier for me to defend Mogador than my dancer! "

She helped introduce dances such as the quadrille and the can-can at the Bal Mabille. Despite the rivalry between Pomaré and Mogador, the two women ended up sharing the stage and a friendship, often dancing the quadrille together. Mogador also performed at the Théâtre Beaumarchais and as an equestrienne at the Cirque Olympique. She is credited with being the first to dance the schottische and she also sang in cabarets, performing songs by Sebastián Iradier. One source has suggested that the character Carmen in Georges Bizet's opera of the same name may have been based on Mogador.

Mogador's newfound fame as a dancer and performer resulted in numerous admirers fighting for her attention. She became a mistress to a number of men, including the Duke of Ossuma and a Dutch baron. These men provided her with financial support, as they would often set her up in her own apartment or lavish her with gifts and money. Prior to her marriage, she wanted to adopt a baby girl whose mother, her maid Marie, died shortly after childbirth. She was unable to legally do so because of her reputation as a courtesan and prostitute so she became the child's godmother instead.

=== Countess, writer and director ===
In 1847, she became the mistress of Lionel de Moreton, Count of Chabrillan. The two quickly fell in love with each other and remained in touch for years while he sailed to and from Australia. Lionel was deep in gambling debt and had lost all of his possessions, but he worked hard as the French consul in Melbourne, Australia. On 9 January 1854, she married Lionel in London and became Countess de Chabrillan despite his family's wishes for him to find a more suitable match. The couple soon sailed for Melbourne where he resumed his position as consul. Prior to her marriage, she was officially dropped from the police register of prostitutes, with her pseudonym Céleste Vénard being struck from the record.

In 1854, shortly before leaving for Australia, she published a memoir Adieu au monde, Mémoires de Céleste Mogador. Her attorney Desmarest convinced her to pen the story of how she worked her way out of poverty to rise to the top of the demimonde. This memoir caused scandal in both Europe and Australia, where the courtesan-turned-countess had just relocated with her new husband. Although ostracized by her new community, she used the two years spent in Melbourne to work on her writing and to pen notes about her new life in a journal. She had little social life due to her reputation and spent twelve to fifteen hours per day writing. While in Melbourne, she wrote Les Voleurs d'or (1857). The success of this novel and her growing love for writing inspired her to return to Paris and write more novels including La Sapho (1858) and Miss Pewell (1859).

Her friend Alexandre Dumas helped her revise a stage version of her best-selling novel Les Voleurs d'or (1857). Her novel, La Sapho (1858), is her only fictional work to address the injustices from which many demimondaines suffered. In the novel, Marie Laurent is seduced and then abandoned. After a suicide attempt, she resurfaces as La Sappho in the London demimonde and pursues revenge. Carol Mossman calls the novel a "vengeance fantasy" that allows de Chabrillan to work through the indignities she suffered as a prostitute: "If the justice sought by Céleste de Chabrillan in the course of her lifetime with respect to the social conditions leading her to her own prostitution remains elusive, she can at least mete it out in fiction."

In 1858, her husband Lionel died in Melbourne, leaving de Chabrillan a widow. In the following years, she struggled to live without her companion despite her many successful literary publications. Even after her husband's death, the de Chabrillan family continued to shun her and attempted to persuade her to give up her name and title, but she refused and proudly remained Celeste de Chabrillan for the remainder of her life. She became a director at the Théâtre des Folies-Marigny but this venture failed within a year. Between 1862 and 1864 she became involved at the Théâtre des Champs-Élysées where she produced and sometimes acted in her own one-act comedies and operettas. She wrote a number of plays, including Les voleurs d'or, Les Crimes de la mer, Les Revers de l'Amour, L'Américaine and Pierre Pascal. She also wrote songs and poems. In these she often references her time in Australia.

Generous and patriotic, during the Franco-Prussian War in 1870, she established Les Sœurs de France to look after wounded soldiers and she opened her home to children orphaned during the war. She earned a public tribute from the women who volunteered with her in the Sœurs de France.

In 1877, she published her second set of memoirs Un deuil au bout du monde, originally composed of notes and diary entries describing her experiences in Melbourne and the death of her husband. She was disappointed that she could not find a publisher for Les Deux Noms, her third set of memoirs which describe her struggles as a widow. Although lost for many years, Jana Verhoeven found these memoirs in France—and with the help of Alan Willey and Jeanne Allen, translated and annotated them. According to a review of these final memoirs, the widowed de Chabrillan confronted numerous difficulties: "There were powerful men who tried to crush Céleste's spirit with no concern for the dire financial consequences of their actions." Her memoirs painfully document her being denied a widow's pension even though her husband had worked as an important government employee. They also recount how the Chabrillan family tried to prevent her from publishing books, staging plays, and running her own theater. She usually managed to overcome such obstacles, but on several occasions, she encountered such obstacles that she attempted suicide.

While she emphasizes the personal hurdles she faced trying to prove herself to others, she also bears witness to the struggles of a female autodidact to achieve literacy and to improve her social standing in nineteenth-century France. Writing would buoy her through her darkest hours during the fifty years she soldiered on without her companion. Although Céleste took great pride in the twelve novels, thirty plays and operettas, and dozen poems and patriotic lyrics she authored, they never provided her with a stable income and, sadly, she struggled financially at several points in her life. Rich in ideas, however, Céleste boasts: "If my numerous works are not outstanding through their literary brilliance, they are so at least by their quantity. I have never imitated anyone and never borrowed from other writers. Maybe I was wrong, but what I wrote is truly mine."

Likely cognizant of the critics who doubted whether a courtesan could really write, and certainly angered by the tendency of male writers to "kill off" courtesans at the end of their novels and plays, Céleste proudly recounted her life beyond prostitution and was ultimately recognized as a writer by her peers. As she notes in the last line of her memoirs, her greatest joy was the memory of "my illustrious protectors from the Association of Stage Authors, who accepted me as one of their own and granted me a pension until the end of my life." Mossman in The Evolution of the French Courtesan Novel argues that de Chabrillan's writings inspired other courtesans like Cora Pearl and Liane de Pougy to protest their alienation in their own autobiographical fictions.

=== Death ===
Mogador died at La Providence, an old people's home, at Montmartre, France, at the age of 84 on 18 February 1909. She was buried next to her mother at the family gravesite at Pré-Saint-Gervais, also next to her mother's lover Vincent.

== Literary work ==
Mogador wrote a series of novels:

- Les Voleurs d'or (1857)
- Sapho (1858)
- Miss Pewell (1859)
- Est-il fou? (1860)
- Un miracle à Vichy (1861)
- Mémoires d'une honnête fille (1865)
- Les Deux Sœurs (1876)
- Les Forçats de l'Amour (1881)
