= Château de Chabrillan =

Ruined castle in Auvergne-Rhône-Alpes, France

Coordinates: 44.7242°N 4.9416°E

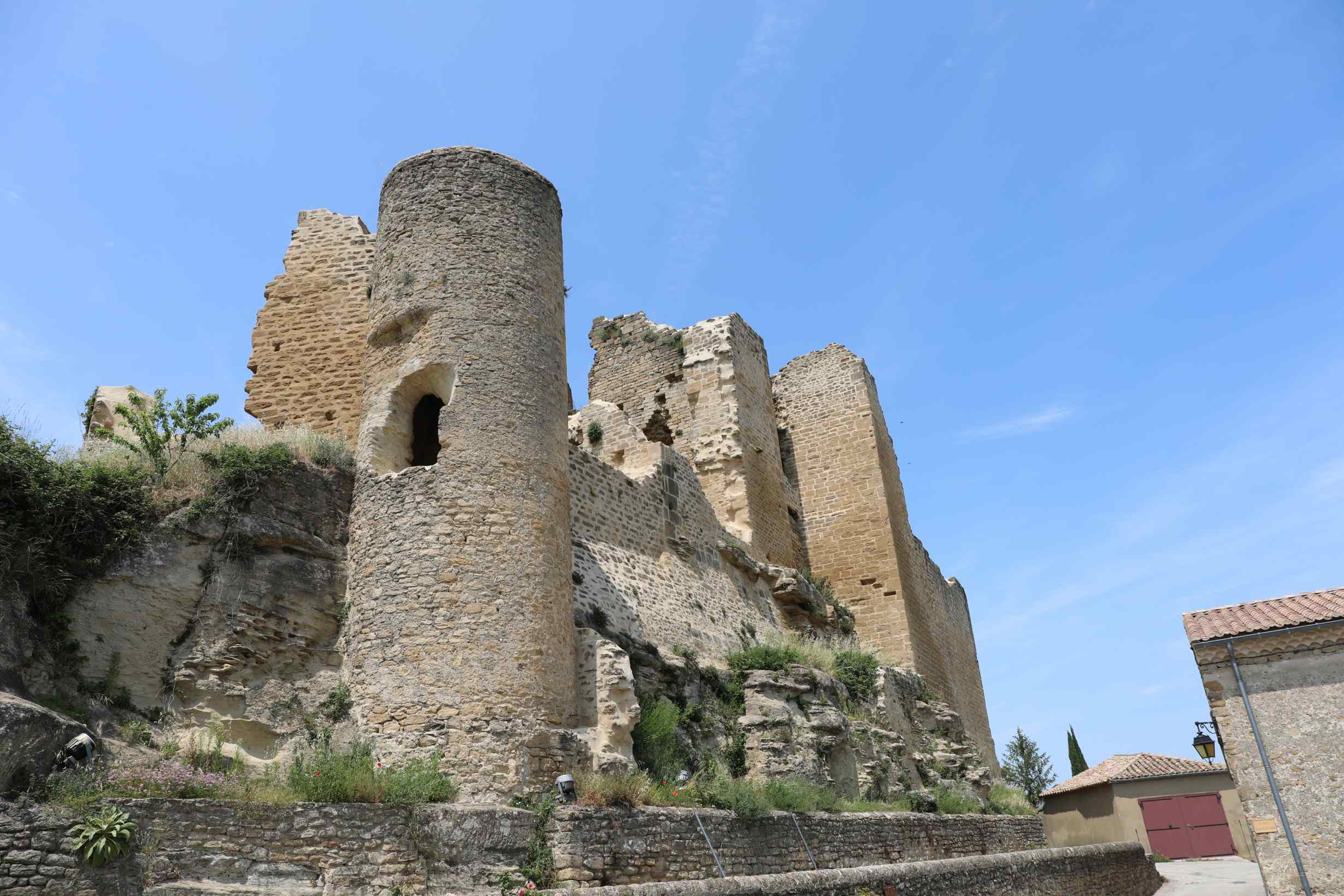
Chateau Chabrillan

The Château de Chabrillan is a ruined castle in the commune of Chabrillan in the Drôme département of France.

The castle was first mentioned in 1150, belonging to the "Chabreihha" family, who also owned Autichamp.

On the northern side of the castle, the square keep is 20 m high with walls almost 2 m thick. Built in the 12th century to protect the lord and his family, it contains no comforts and was intended purely as a refuge. The only entrance to the keep was by a door about halfway up, reached by a wooden ladder. To the south, a round tower is more recent. Between the two were another keep and other buildings which were added later to form a complete fortress and to serve as a residence. To the east, a well provided water. A document from 1634 mentions a room for playing tens.

The Moreton family left the castle around 1650 (their descendants still own it). At the time of the French Revolution, its roof had gone. It was declared a national asset and was used as a quarry, its stones being reused in buildings across the commune.

The castle is privately owned. It has been listed since 1926 as a monument historique by the French Ministry of Culture.

== See also ==
- List of castles in France
