= Théâtre des Folies-Marigny =

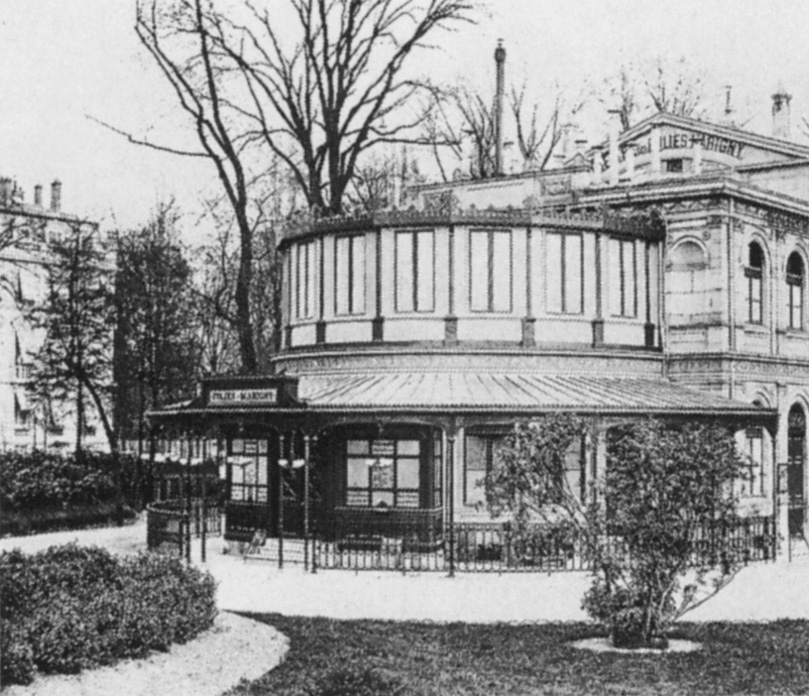
- The Théâtre des Folies-Marigny, sometime before its demolition in 1881
- Interactive map of Théâtre des Folies-Marigny
- Former names: Salle Lacaze (1848–1852?); Bouffes-Parisiens (1855–57, 59); Théâtre Deburau (1858); Théâtre Féérique (1861); Théâtre des Champs-Élysées (1862–1863); Folies Marigny (1864-1881)
- Address: Carré Marigny on the Champs-Élysées, 8th arrondissement of Paris
- Coordinates: 48.868631°N 2.313669°E
- Capacity: 300

Construction
- Opened: 1848
- Demolished: 1881

The Théâtre des Folies-Marigny (French pronunciation: [teɑtʁ de fɔli maʁiɲi]), a former theatre with a capacity of only 300 spectators, was built in 1848 by the City of Paris for a magician named Lacaze and was originally known as the Salle Lacaze. It was located at the east end of the Carré Marigny of the Champs-Élysées, close to the Avenue Marigny, but faced west toward the Cirque National on the other side of the square.

In 1855 the Salle Lacaze became the home of Jacques Offenbach's Théâtre des Bouffes-Parisiens, where he first built his reputation as a theatre composer. It was subsequently used unsuccessfully by several companies until 1864, when it again became a profitable operetta theatre called the Folies-Marigny. When this company diminished in popularity, the theatre was closed. It was demolished in 1881 and replaced with the Panorama Marigny which was converted into the Théâtre Marigny in 1893.

== Salle Lacaze ==
The first recorded entertainment use of the site dates to 1835, when a showman set up attractions at the Marigny junction. After the French Revolution of 1848 a small theatre called the Salle Lacaze was built for a magician named Lacaze. It was a summer theatre, and in it he presented "legerdemain and amusing physical representations." His theatre was also known as the Château d'Enfer (Castle of the Underworld). Lacaze began losing money, and sometime after 1852 he closed down.

== Bouffes-Parisiens ==
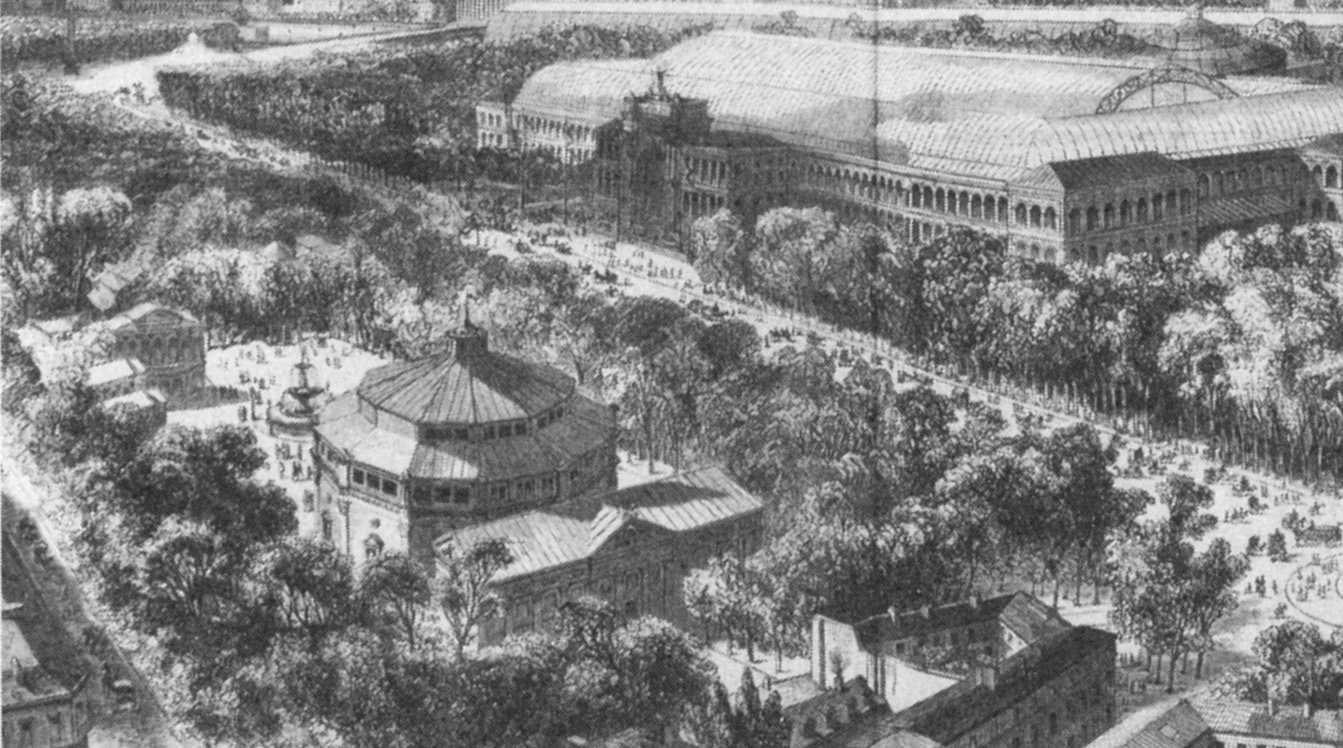
View of the Palais de l'Industrie on the far side the Champs-Élysées and the Carré Marigny with the Cirque de l'Impératrice at the front slightly left of center and the small Salle Lacaze (the first theatre of Offenbach's Théâtre des Bouffes-Parisiens) across the square at the left

In the spring of 1855 the composer Jacques Offenbach decided that the position of this modest wooden theatre was perfectly situated on the Carré Marigny to catch overspill traffic from the Universal Exposition of 1855; after some modifications to the site he opened the Théâtre des Bouffes-Parisiens on 5 July 1855. The theatre had a capacity of only 300 spectators. At the inaugural performance, Offenbach conducted four of his own works, the last of which was Les deux aveugles, a one-act bouffonerie musicale about two swindling "blind" Parisian beggars. This little piece soon acquired an international reputation due to visitors from the Exposition and due to some controversy over its subject matter. Another notable premiere that summer was Le violoneux. Further performances in the summer of 1855 were primarily of satirical sketches which only included a few musical numbers. The season, however, was so successful that Offenbach was able to resign his position as conductor of the Théâtre Français. This theatre was soon renamed Bouffes d'Été, as during the winter Offenbach directed the Bouffes d'Hiver in the Salle Choiseul on the rue Monsigny. The company also used the Salle Lacaze for the 1856, 1857, and 1859 summer seasons, and a total of 16 Offenbach pieces were premiered here by the Bouffes-Parisiens.

Offenbach sublet the hall to the mime Charles Deburau in 1858 for one unsuccessful summer season (5 June to 14 October), when it was known as the Théâtre Deburau or the Bouffes-Deburau. Deburau's season included the premieres of three 1-act pieces with music by Hervé: Le voiturier (3 September), La belle espagnole (22 September), and Simple histoire (10 October).

After Deburau, the theatre was again used by the Bouffes-Parisiens (1859). During the summer of 1860 Offenbach's company performed in Brussels in June, while Offenbach himself went to Berlin to conduct the Berlin premiere of Orphée aux enfers, and from July to early August the company performed in Lyon, leaving the Salle Lacaze empty. Legislation enacted in March 1861 prevented the Bouffes-Parisiens from continuing to use both theatres, and their appearances at the Salle Lacaze were discontinued.

== Théâtre Féerique ==
On 1 January 1861 Raignard, inventor of a novel system of décors and tricks, applied for permission to use the theatre for presentations between 2 and 5 p.m. at reduced prices targeted at the "numerous persons of a variable population", whose occupations and limited means kept them from attending the theatre in the evening. He also intended it to help young authors, composers, and actors. By a ministerial order of 5 February his repertory was limited to one- and two-act comédies-vaudevilles and operettas (with at most 5 characters) and one- and two-act féeries (melodramas with magic) with tableaus, choruses, and dances. Performances were given under the name Théâtre Féerique des Champs-Élysées or Petit Théâtre Féerique des Champs-Élysées. After the failure of this enterprise, the director was dismissed by a decree of 3 August 1861, and on 7 August a second decree authorized the artists to continue performances as a society under the direction of Octave Guillier. This effort was abandoned, however, by 31 August.

The theatre was next used by Charles Bridault, who brought his Théâtre du Châlet des Îles in. This troupe had previously performed in the Bois de Boulogne from 13 June to 31 August. Their run of performances on the Champs-Élysées was short, however, only lasting from 3 to 10 September.

== Théâtre des Champs-Élysées ==
The theatre was next acquired by Céleste Mogador (Mme Lionel de Chabrillan), who had it renovated and rechristened as the Théâtre des Champs-Élysées (not to be confused with the later Théâtre des Champs-Élysées on the avenue Montaigne). She gave its direction to Eugène Audray-Deshorties, who received his authorization on 20 January 1862 and reopened the theatre on 19 April. His repertory was confined to one-, two-, and three-act comédies and vaudevilles (with intermèdes of song and dance) and operettas of one act, and was mainly borrowed from the Folies-Dramatiques (from the Boulevard du Temple), the Bouffes-Parisiens, and the Variétés. Due to poor management, he retired in September, and the theatre was rented to the troupe of the Folies-Dramatiques from 14 September to 6 November. Mme Chabrillan took over again in 1863. She applied for permission to open a café, with vocal concerts inside and instrumental concerts outside on the terrace, and provisionally entrusted its direction to Auguste Armand Bourgoin, who began on 22 June 1863. The theatre was sold to Louis-Émile Hesnard (the actor known as Montrouge) on 27 February 1864.

== Folies-Marigny ==
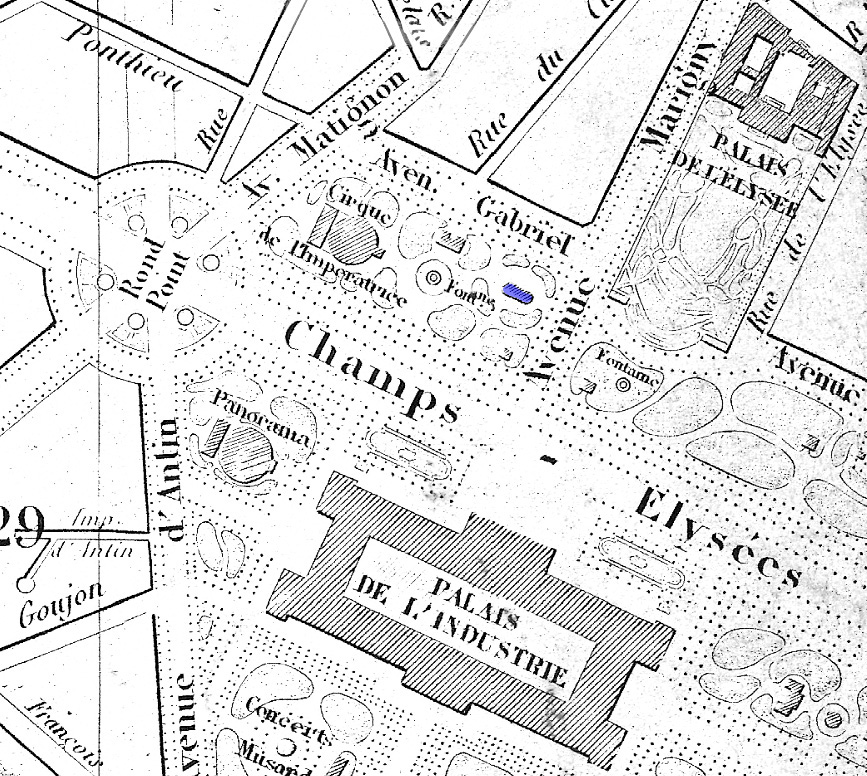
The Folies-Marigny (blue) on an 1869 map of Paris

Montrouge and his future wife Mlle Macé, turned it into a popular success as the Théâtre des Folies-Marigny (26 March 1864). Several early operettas of Charles Lecocq were performed here. The tenor Achille-Félix Montaubry, who had formerly performed at the Opéra-Comique but had experienced a decline in the allure of his voice, purchased the Folies-Marigny in 1868, and produced an operetta of his own composition called Horace. In April 1870 the theatre was taken over by Leduc. The last performance was in April 1881, and shortly thereafter it was demolished, to be replaced with a panorama designed by the architect Charles Garnier. In 1893 Garnier's panorama was converted by the architect Édouard Niermans into a new theatre, which opened on 22 January 1896 under the name Folies-Marigny, but this was soon shortened to Marigny-Théâtre or Théâtre Marigny.
