= Max Bouvet =

French operatic baritone (1854–1943)

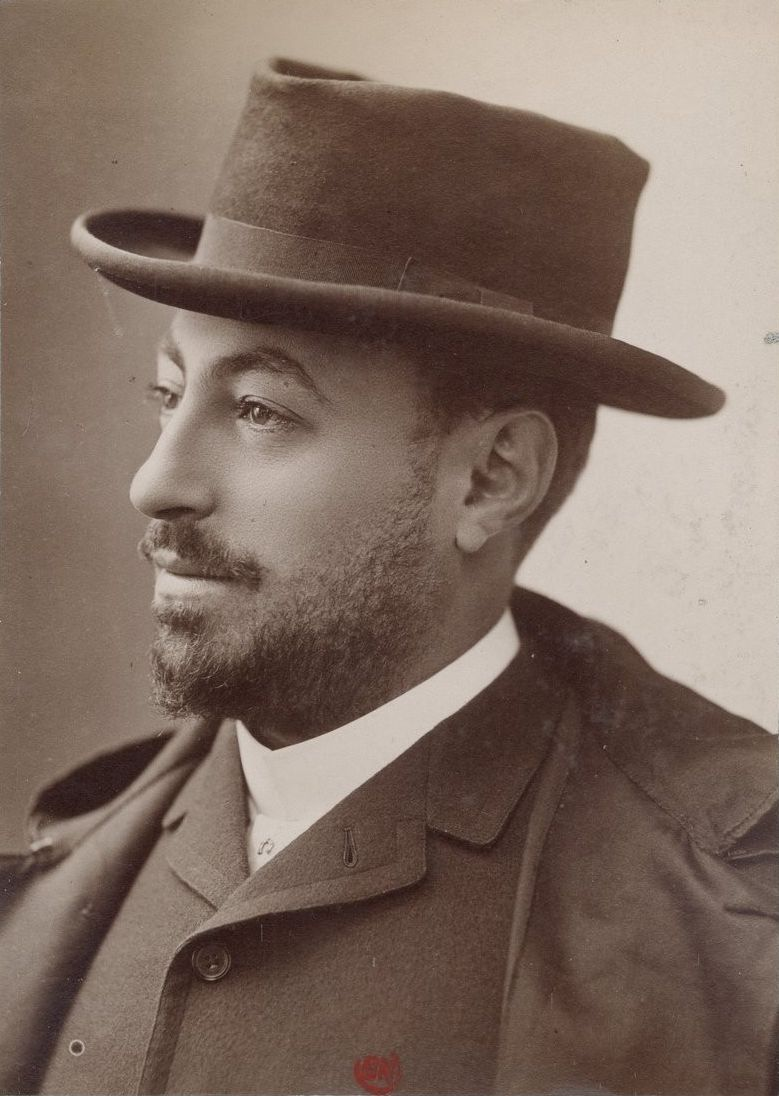
Maximilien-Nicolas Bouvet

Maximilien-Nicolas Bouvet (1854 – 1943) was a French operatic baritone.

Bouvet was born at La Rochelle. In 1875, he appeared at the Eldorado café-concert in Paris with the song Les myrtes son flétries by Gustave Nadaud and de Faure.

He made his debut at the Opéra Royal de Wallonie in Liege, and appeared at the Théâtre des Folies-Dramatiques in Paris in the premiere of Fanfan la Tulipe (title role) on 21 October 1882, followed in 1883 by La fille de Madame Angot, L'amour qui passe and François les bas-bleus.

His debut at the Opéra-Comique was in 1884 as Figaro in Le Barbier de Seville.

At the Opéra-Comique he also sang Alfio (Cavalleria rusticana), Oreste (Iphigénie en Tauride), Garrido (La Navarraise), the Dutchman (Flying Dutchman), Marcel (La Boheme), Albert (Werther), Escamillo (Carmen), Ourrias (Mireille) and Zurga (Les pêcheurs de perles).

In 1891 he sang Wotan in Siegfried in the house premiere at La Monnaie (Bruxelles), and from 1891 to 1894 he was a guest artist at Covent Garden.

From 1905 he taught, including a post from 1905 to 1911 at the Paris Conservatoire. His final documented stage appearance was in the role of the Inquisitor in Don Carlos and took place in 1911 at the Gaîté-Lyrique in Paris, alongside Feodor Chaliapin. He died in Paris.

A compilation of 13 of his records has been reissued on CD by Marston Records.

== Roles created ==
- Title role in Fanfan la Tulipe (Paris, 1882)
- Title role in François les bas-bleus (Paris, 1883)
- Henri de Valois, 'King of Poland' in Le roi malgré lui (Paris, 1887)
- Prince Karnac in Le roi d'Ys (Paris, 1888)
- The Bishop of Blois in Esclarmonde (Paris, 1889)
- Spendius in Salammbô (Brussels, 1890)
- Merlier in L'attaque du moulin (Paris, 1893)
- Harès in Messaline (Monte Carlo, 1899)
