= Rigolboche =

French dancer

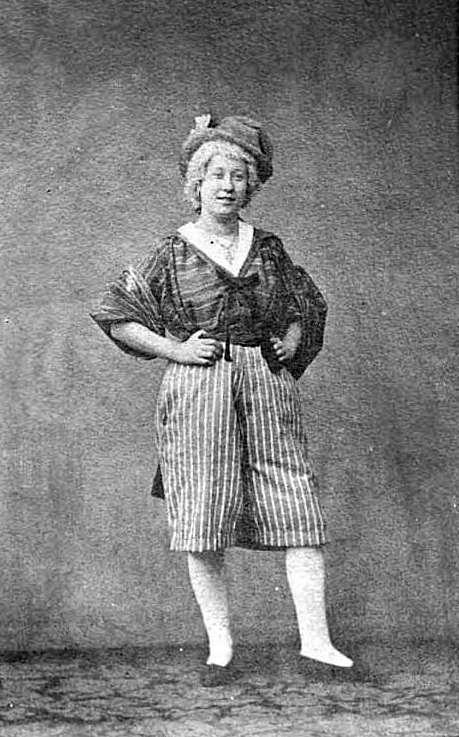
Rigolboche

Amelia Marguerite Badel (stage name, Rigolboche; nicknamed "the Huguenot"; Nancy, 13 June 1842 - Bobigny, 1 February 1920) was a French dancer. Credited for inventing the can-can, her acme occurred from 1858 to 1861. Her stage name, Rigolboche, is a slang term formed from the word "funny" and the suffix boche designating a "joker" or a very funny person.
