= Firmin Bernicat =

French composer

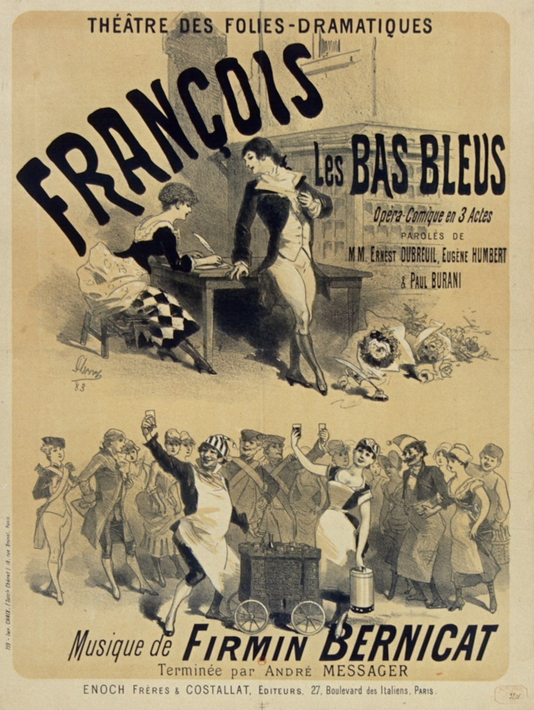
François les bas-bleus, poster by Jules Chéret (1883).

Claude Firmin Bernicat (13 January 1842 – 5 March 1883) was a 19th-century French operetta composer.

== Biography ==
Bernicat was born in Lyon. He moved to Paris in the mid-1860s and studied music with Jules Duprato, probably at the Conservatoire de Paris.

He began his career in Parisian café-concerts. Early in his career, he composed some short operas for the Paris theatre L'Eldorado. He also made his living as a music arranger and orchestrator for composers including Robert Planquette and wrote songs for the stars of the era: Le Chemin des noisettes or La Pigeonne.

He wrote about thirty works, most one-act operettas and humorous or sentimental skits, for example Ali Pot-d’rhum (1869), Les Cadets de Gascogne, Le Cornette or Une aventure de la Clairon. He eventually attracted the attention of the Director of the Fantaisies-Parisiennes in Brussels, who produced his first work in three acts, Les Beignets du Roi (1882), with a libretto by Albert Carré and Paul Ferrier. The piece was a success, but Bernicat did not attend because his fragile health did not allow him to leave Paris. He then wrote the libretto and began composition for an opéra comique, François les bas-bleus, before he died of tuberculosis at the age of 41. His publisher, Enoch & Costallat, asked André Messager to complete the score. The opera premiered at the Folies-Dramatiques in Paris in 1884, running for 131 performances. It was then regularly revived in Paris.
