= Chabrillan =

- Commune
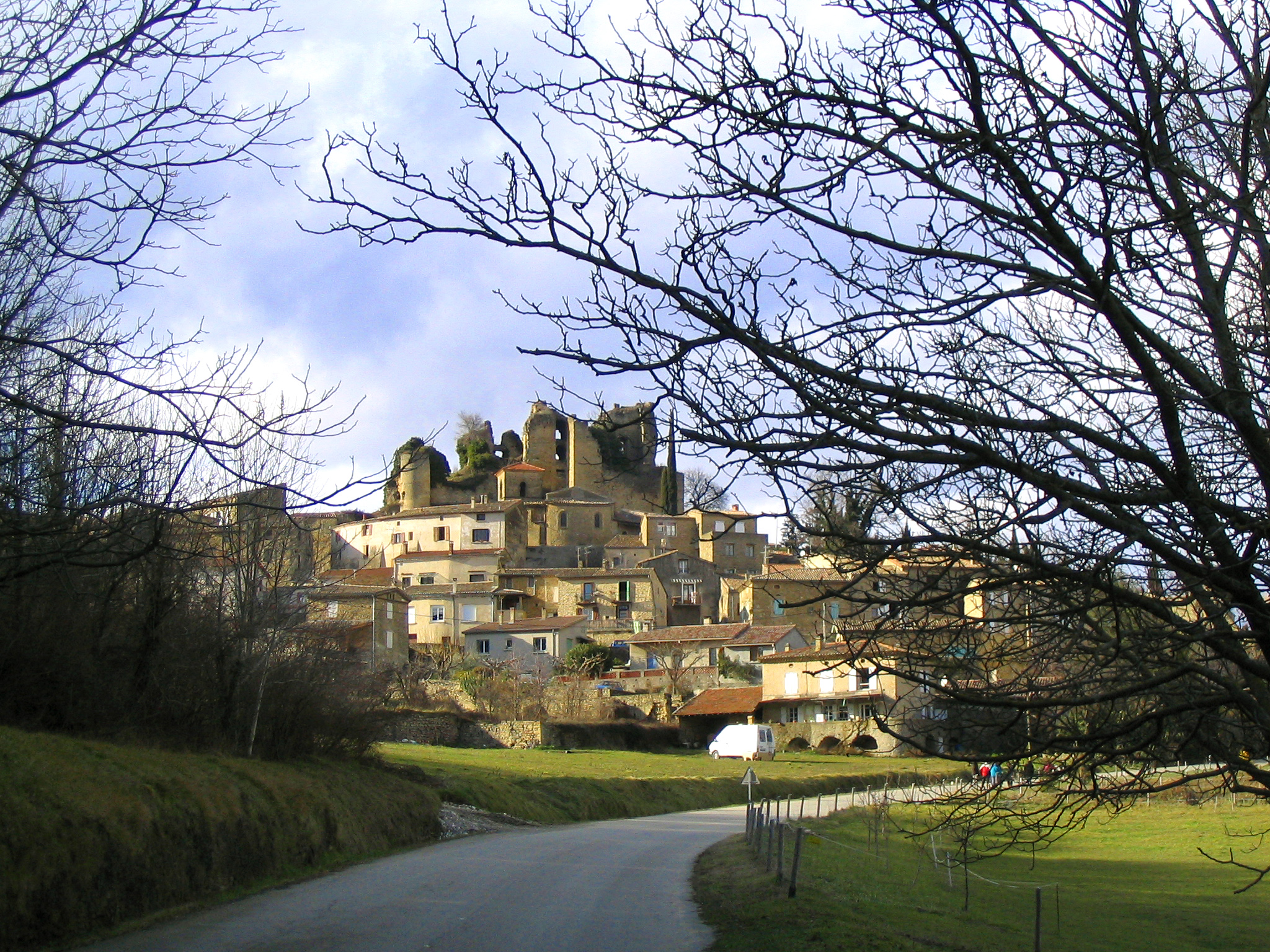
- A general view of Chabrillan
- Location of Chabrillan
- Location within France Location within Auvergne-Rhône-Alpes
- Coordinates: 44°43′28″N 4°56′32″E
- Country: France
- Region: Auvergne-Rhône-Alpes
- Department: Drôme
- Arrondissement: Die
- Canton: Crest
- Intercommunality: Val de Drôme en Biovallée

Government
  - Mayor (2020–2026): Cyrille Vallon
- Area^{1}: 17.75 km^{2} (6.85 sq mi)
- Highest elevation: 352 m (1,155 ft)
- Lowest elevation: 149 m (489 ft)
- Population (2023): 752
  - Density: 42.4/km^{2} (110/sq mi)
- Time zone: UTC+01:00 (CET)
  - Summer (DST): UTC+02:00 (CEST)
- INSEE/Postal code: 26065 /26400
- ^{1} French Land Register data, which excludes lakes, ponds, glaciers > 1 km^{2} (0.386 sq mi or 247 acres) and river estuaries.

Chabrillan (French pronunciation: [ʃabʁijɑ̃]; Occitan: Chabrelha) is a commune of the Drôme département in southeastern France.

== Population ==
Historical population
Year	Pop.	±% p.a.
1968	474	—
1975	494	+0.59%
1982	544	+1.39%
1990	629	+1.83%
1999	608	−0.38%
2007	654	+0.92%
2012	664	+0.30%
2017	721	+1.66%
2023	752	+0.70%
Source: INSEE

== Sights and monuments ==
The French Ministry of Culture has designated two buildings as monuments historiques in Chabrillan:

- Château de Chabrillan, ruins of medieval castle.
- Eglise Saint-Pierre, the church.

== See also ==
- Communes of the Drôme department
