= Geoffroy Saint-Hilaire =

Geoffroy Saint-Hilaire may refer to:

- Étienne Geoffroy Saint-Hilaire (1772–1844), French naturalist
- Isidore Geoffroy Saint-Hilaire (1805–1861), French zoologist who coined the term ethology, son of Étienne Saint-Hilaire
- Albert Geoffroy Saint-Hilaire (1835–1919), French zoologist, coined the binomial nomenclature name for the Chinese monal pheasant, son of Isidore Saint-Hilaire
