= Épinettes =

Administrative quarter in Paris, France

Coordinates: 48°53′38″N 2°19′21″E

17th arrondissement

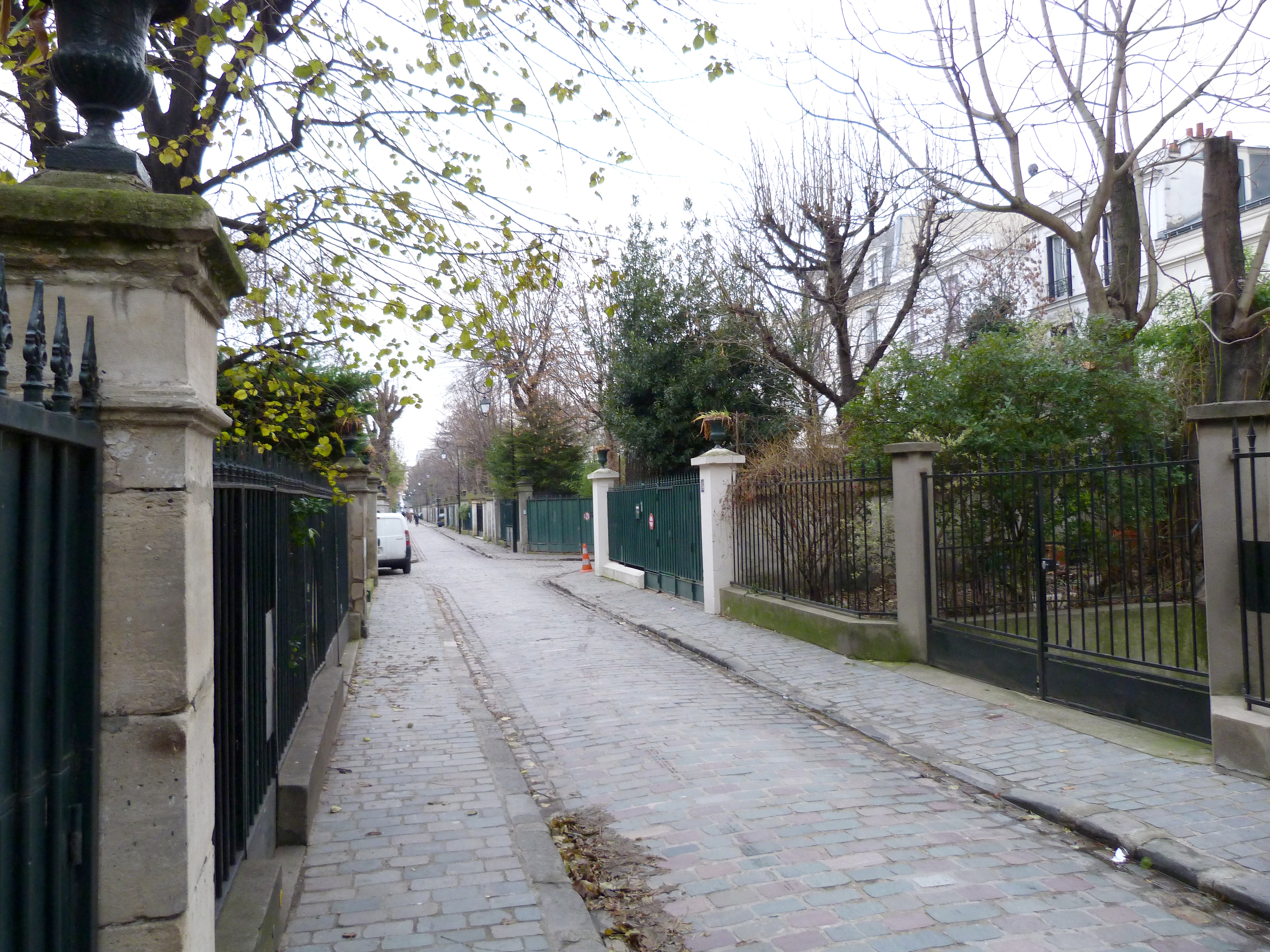
The Cité des Fleurs in winter

Épinettes (French pronunciation: [epinɛt]) is a neighborhood of Paris, a part of the 17th arrondissement of the city. The neighborhood is bounded by the Avenue de Clichy, the Avenue de Saint-Ouen and the boundaries of Paris in the North.

== History ==
Epinettes were part of Batignolles, an independent village outside Paris, until 1860 when the emperor Napoleon III annexed it to the capital. An agricultural area until the middle of the 19th century, it then evolved into an industrial district, with several factories such as those of Ernest Goüin. Housings were built in typical Parisian style, with a majority of Haussmannian buildings. The Cité des Fleurs, a picturesque pedestrian street with small houses with gardens in the heart of the city, is also built at that time.

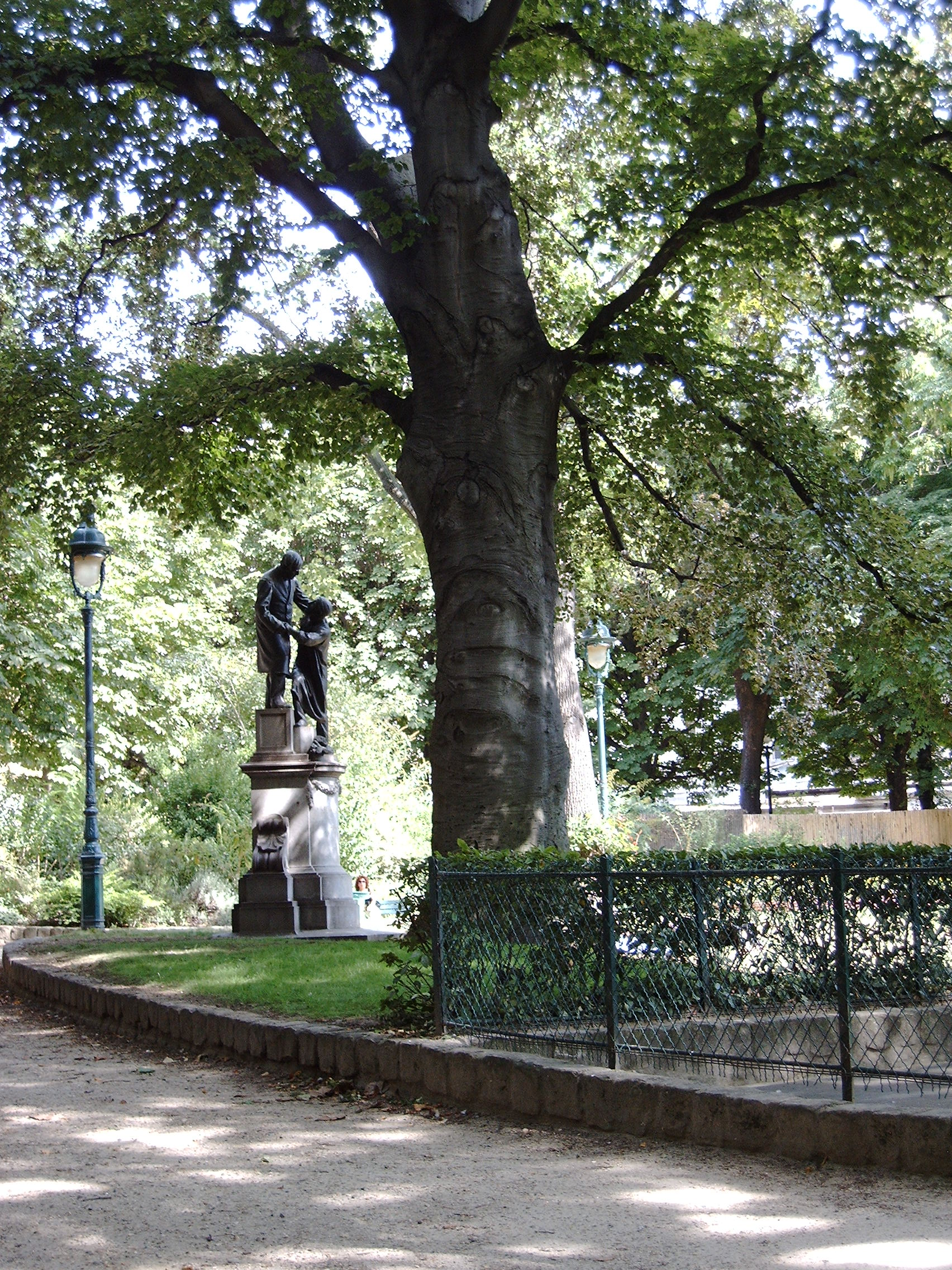
Statue in the Square des Épinettes

Like the neighbouring Batignolles, Epinettes, especially the south-western part (Brochant & La Fourche) was strongly linked to impressionism. The "groupe des Batignolles" met in Café Guerbois or at Chez le père Lathuille, avenue de Clichy. Famous writer Émile Zola lived also in the district, as did painter Alfred Sisley in the Cité des Fleurs (City of the Flowers) or poet Jules Laforgue.

Several famous left-leaning politicians or activists from the turn of the 20th century came from Epinettes: Paul Brousse or Maria Deraismes. Famous singer Fréhel also grew up there. It was also influenced by industrial paternalism, especially of Edme-Jean Leclaire or Ernest Goüin.

Even though industries left the district as they did in the rest of Paris, its population has long been mostly middle class. It has evolved towards gentrification or embourgeoisement in French, as some sociologists or newspapers noted. Real estate prices have strongly grown, especially in the South-Western part between the Avenue de Clichy, the Avenue de Saint-Ouen and the Rue Guy Môquet.

== Places ==
In the Epinettes district you can see the square des Épinettes, the Cité des Fleurs and the cimetière des Batignolles (André Breton, Paul Verlaine, Blaise Cendrars, Ray Ventura or Benjamin Peret are buried there.

== Metro stations ==
Epinettes is served by lines 2 and 13:

Located near the Metro stations: La Fourche, Rome and Brochant.
