= Squares in Paris =

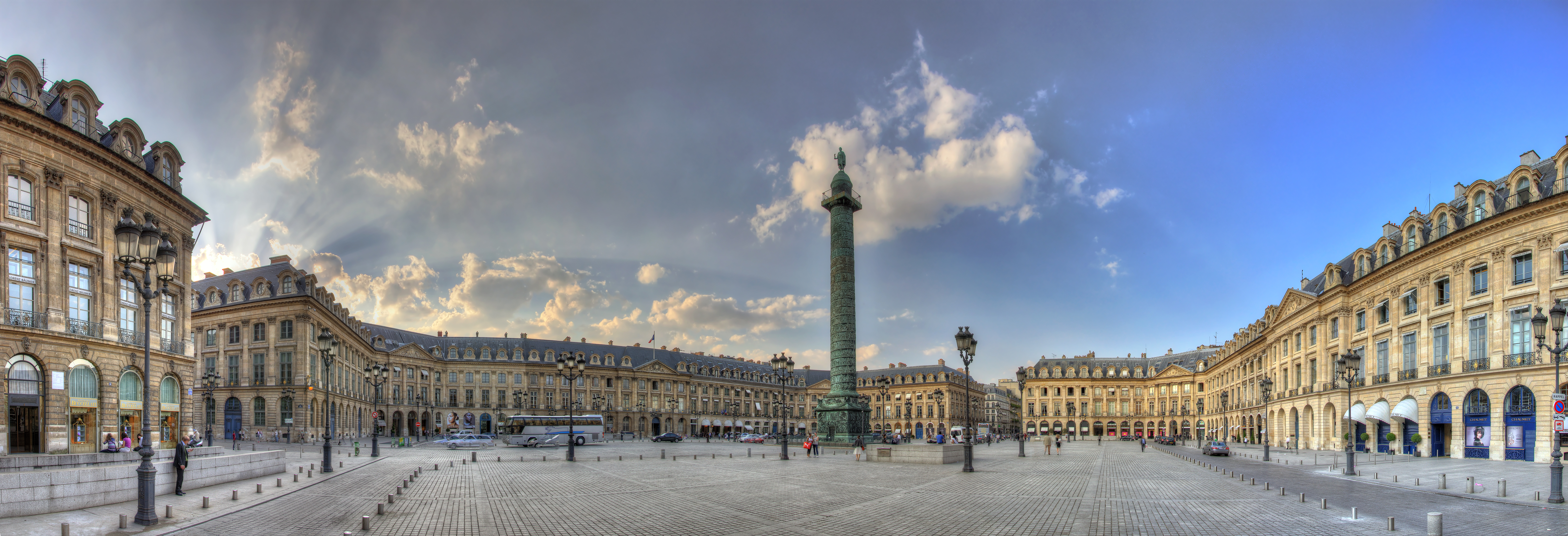
A panoramic view of the Place Vendôme, Paris

Paris is known as the City of Light. Part of the credit for this sobriquet can be ascribed to long-standing city ordinances that have restricted the height of buildings in the central city. A more modest skyline, interrupted only by the Eiffel Tower, the Tour Montparnasse, Sacré-Coeur, and a few church steeples, lends this city's citizens virtually unfettered access to natural light. Nonetheless, another significant contributor to the feeling of openness in Paris is the vast number of public spaces, both green and paved, interspersed throughout all twenty arrondissements, that afford the citizen the opportunity to escape, if only momentarily, his urban environment and partake of air and light like his cousins in the provinces. The following article (and its accompanying list) concern the public spaces known as squares and places in Paris.

== Terminology ==
The terminology of open spaces in Paris (square vs. place) may present some confusion to English speakers.

In the French language, the term square (a loan-word from English) refers to a small urban green space that is not large enough to be called a parc (the grassy variety) or a bois (the wooded variety), and is not sufficiently formal in its plantings to be called a jardin. (For a list of these spaces, see List of parks and gardens in Paris.) In English this may be called a "pocket park," a "green" as in "the village green", or even a "square", as in the squares of Savannah, Georgia.

Conversely, the term place in French refers to a city square which usually does not include green space and may be paved. In the English-speaking world, this is usually termed a "square" such as Times Square in New York or Trafalgar Square in London.

In summary, the French have squares that might be, but are usually not, called "squares" in English, and they have places that are almost always called "squares" in English.

== Squares and places ==
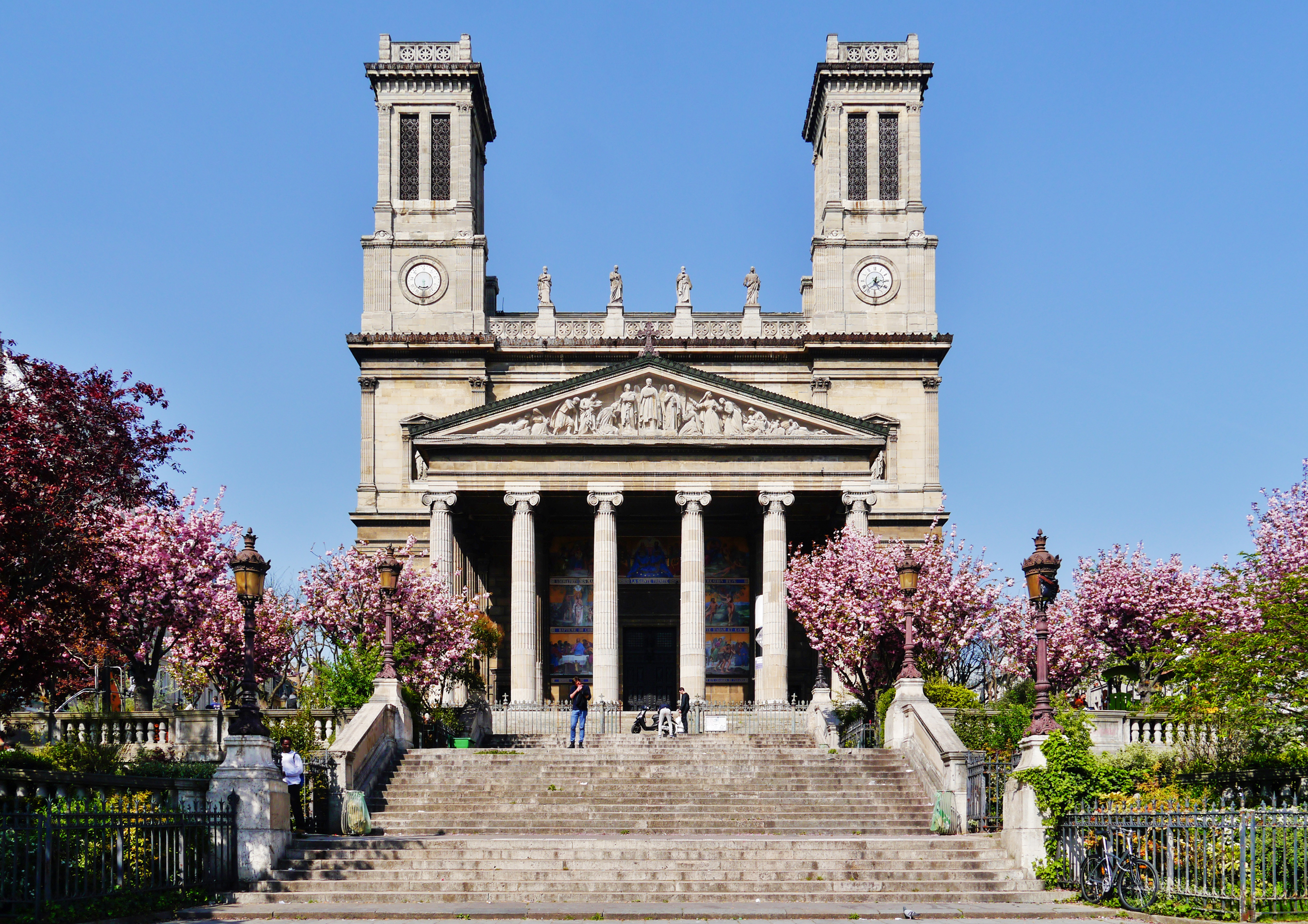
The Church of Saint-Vincent-de-Paul within the square of the same name facing the Place Franz Liszt

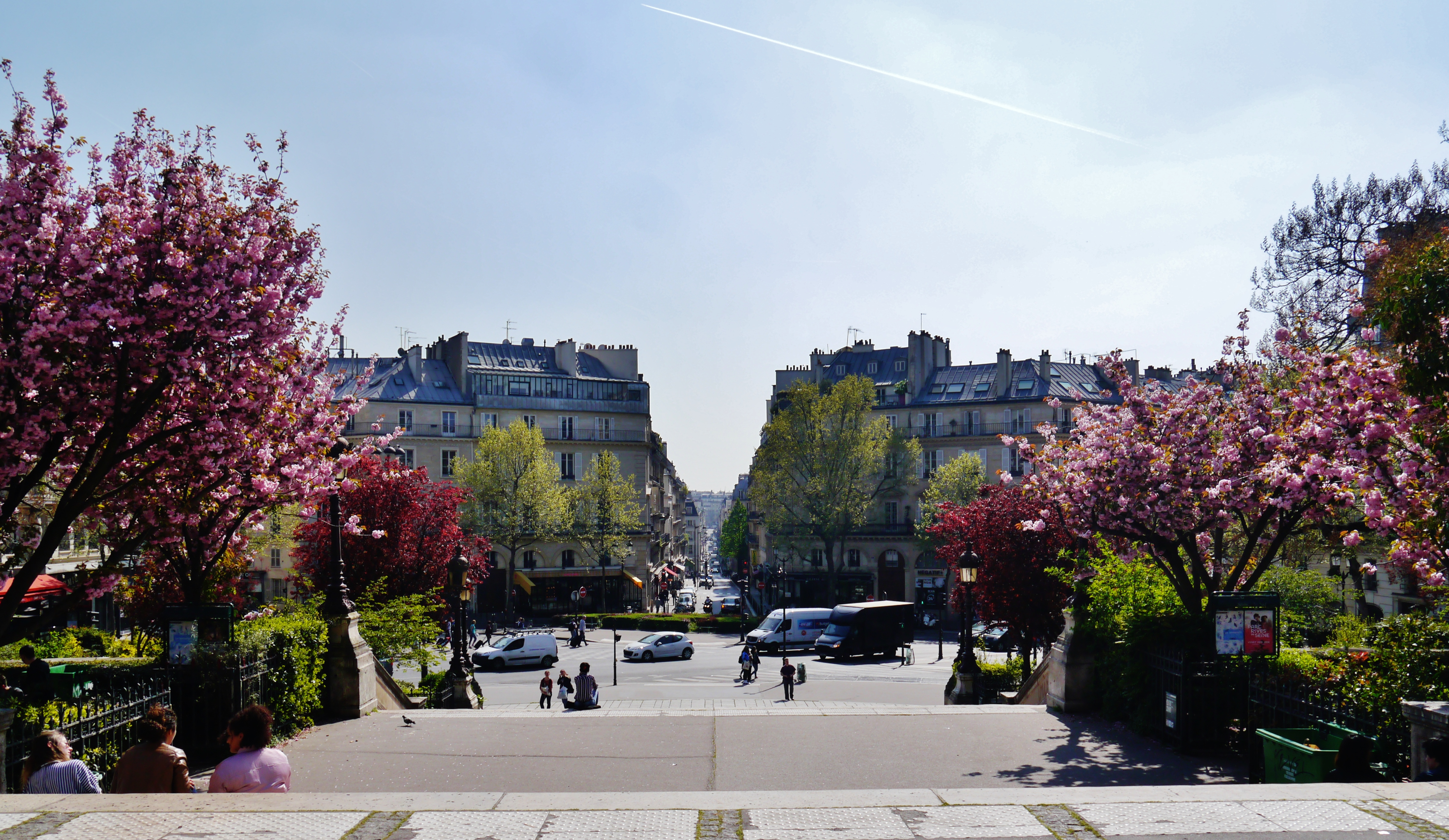
The Place Franz Liszt seen from the Church of Saint-Vincent-de-Paul within the square of the same name

To make things a bit more complicated, in Paris, a "square" (small green space) may abut a place (large public square), or a "square" may, in fact, be contained within a place. The "square" and the associated place typically have different names. Some examples are:

- Square des Innocents and Place Joachim du Bellay
- Square Marcel Pagnol and Place Henri Bergson
- Square des Batignolles and Place Charles Fillion
- Square Berlioz and Place Adolphe Max
- Square de la Trinité and Place d'Estienne-d'Orves
- Square Saint-Vincent-de-Paul and Place Franz Liszt
- Square Monseigneur Maillet and Place des Fêtes
- Square Thomas Jefferson and Place des États-Unis

Rarely, the "square" and its associated place share a name:

- Square Ferdinand Brunot and Place Ferdinand Brunot
- Square de la Chapelle and Place de la Chapelle

Finally, there are some pairs (of squares and places) where the name of the square is a bit artificial, but the relationship is, nonetheless, clear:

- Square de la place André-Masson
- Square de la place Dauphine
- Square de la place de Bitche
- Square de la place de la Bataille de Stalingrad
- Square de la place de la Nation
- Square de la place de la Réunion
- Square de la place d'Italie
- Square de la place du Commerce
- Square de la place Étienne Pernet
- Square de la place Pasdeloup

== Characteristics of Parisian squares ==
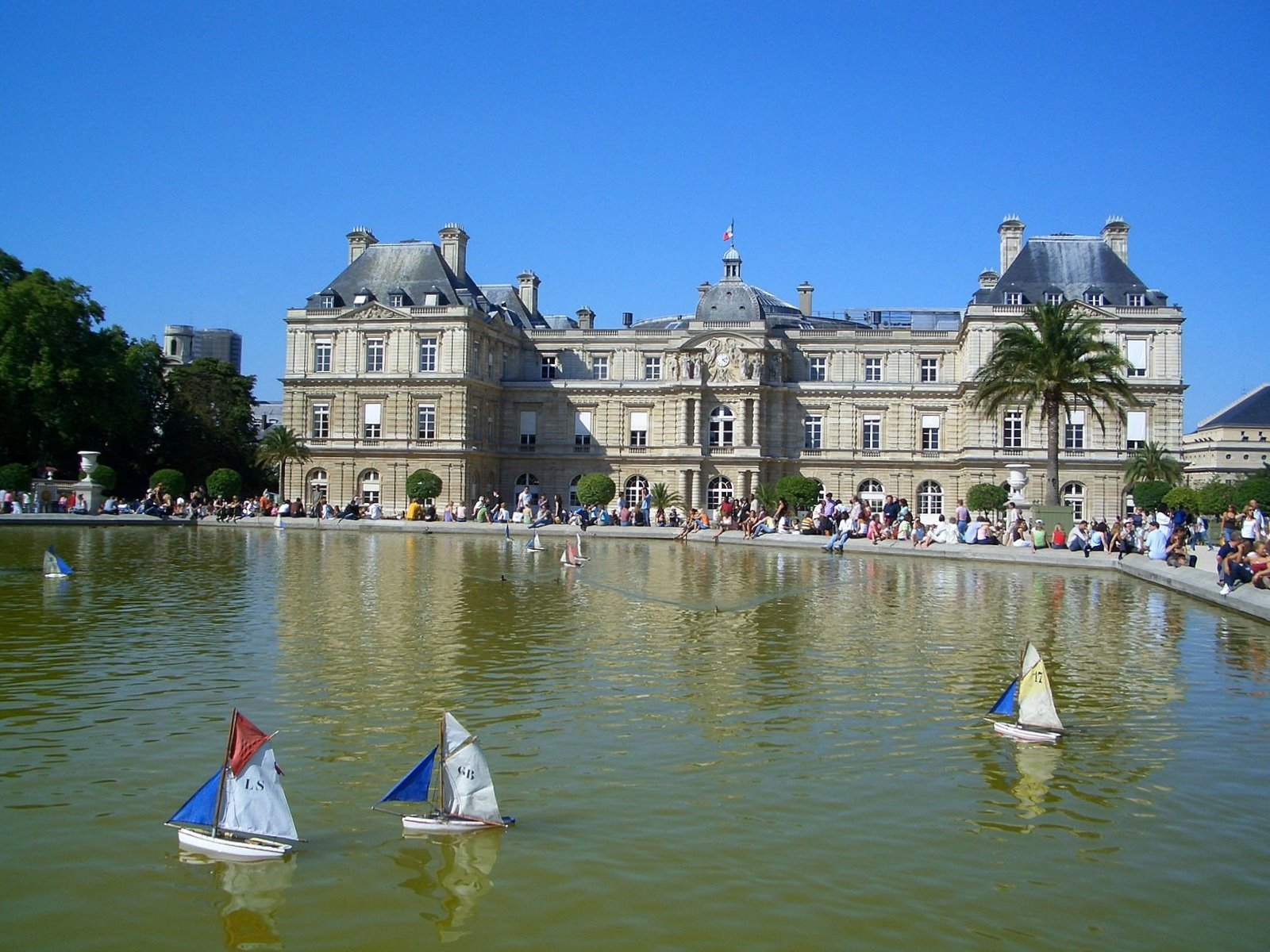
Model sailboats on the Grand Bassin of the Jardin du Luxembourg, similar to those found in the Tuileries Garden

In all Parisian squares, gardens, and parks, you will find areas reserved for children, with playgrounds, sandboxes, see-saws, swings, merry-go-rounds, and the like. Some spaces offer a wider range of activities; some random examples are: toy boats to sail, as well as sulky and go-cart rentals in the Jardin du Luxembourg; ping-pong tables in the Square Emile-Chautemps and the Jardin de l'Observatoire; pony or carriage rides at the Parc Monceau; tennis courts, boules, and croquet at the Jardin du Luxembourg; Guignol marionette puppet shows at the Jardin du Ranelagh; roller skating at the Parc Montsouris; a bee-keeping school at the Jardin du Luxembourg; bandstands featuring spring and summer concerts at the Square du Temple and the Parc des Buttes-Chaumont, etc.

These open spaces also beckon visitors just to wander and daydream, and many offer lush green lawns for sitting, taking a rest, or perhaps a picnic. One is advised, nonetheless, to watch for signs posted on lawns that are accessible to the public: pelouses autorisées (lawns authorized for use) and "pelouses au repos" (lawns for resting).

== List of squares and places in Paris ==
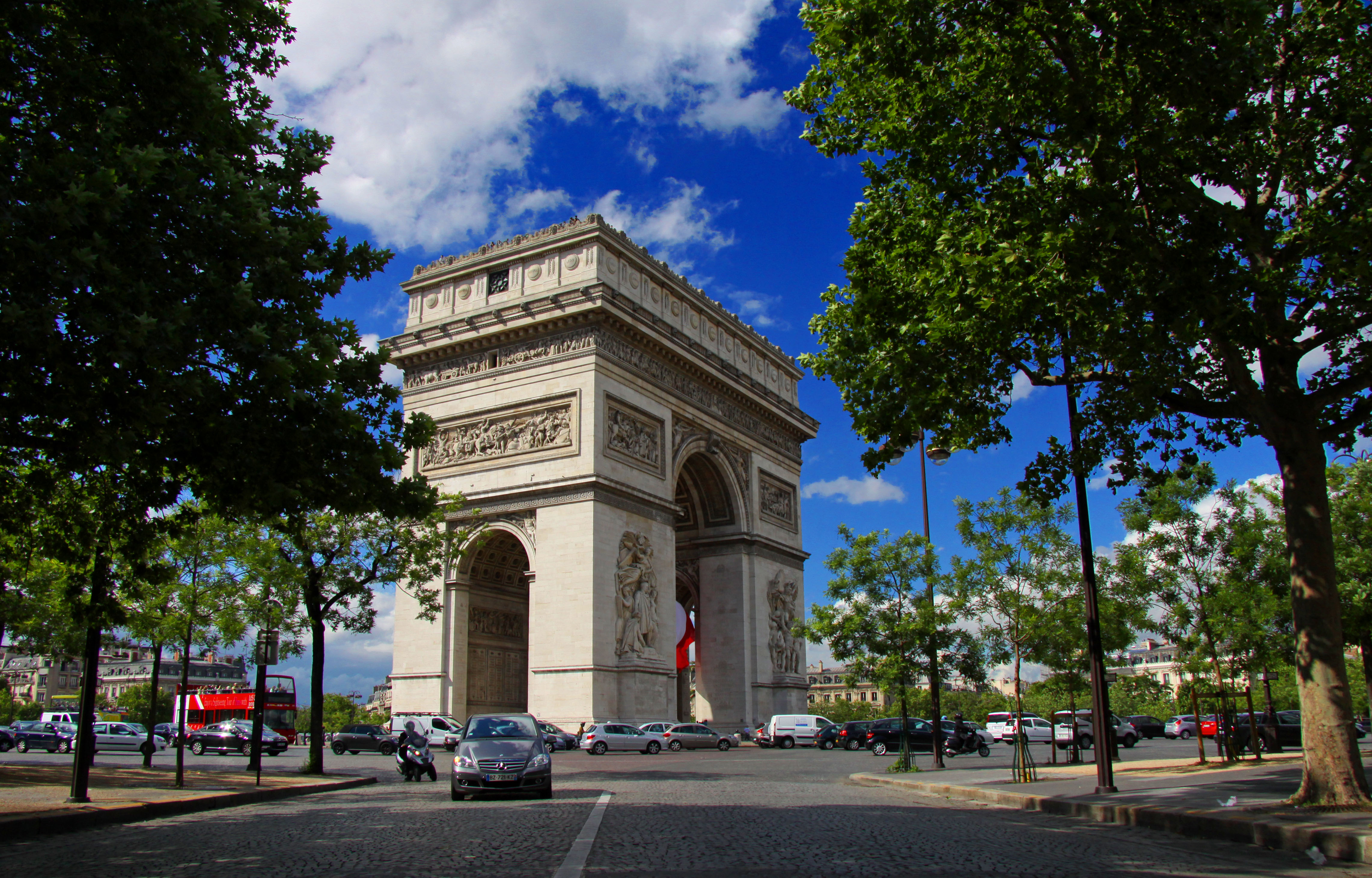
Place Charles de Gaulle, Paris

As of 1 May 2008, the city of Paris acknowledged the following public squares (in the broader 'English' sense of the word). A citizen of Paris will notice, of course, that the following alphabetized list includes both "squares" (smaller green spaces) and places (larger urban landmarks), which have been segregated from one another within this single list.

=== 0/9 ===
- Place du 11-Novembre-1918
- Place du 18-Juin-1940
- Place du 25-Août-1944
- Place du 8 Février 1962
- Place du 8 Novembre 1942

=== A ===
- Place de l'Abbé-Basset
- Place de l'Abbé-Franz-Stock
- Place de l'Abbé-Georges-Hénocque
- Place de l'Abbé-Jean-Lebeuf
- Place des Abbesses
- Place d'Acadie
- Place de l'Adjudant-Vincenot
- Place Adolphe-Chérioux
- Place Adolphe-Max
- Place Adrien-Oudin
- Place Aimé-Maillart
- Place Albert-Cohen
- Place Albert-Kahn
- Place Albert-Londres
- Place Alfred-Dreyfus
- Place Alfred-Kastler
- Place Alfred-Sauvy
- Place d'Aligre
- Place d'Alleray
- Place de l'Alma
- Place des Alpes
- Place Alphonse-Allais
- Place Alphonse-Deville
- Place Alphonse-Humbert
- Place Alphonse-Laveran
- Place Amédée-Gordini
- Place de l'Amiral-de-Grasse
- Place de l'Amphithéâtre
- Place André-Honnorat
- Place André-Malraux
- Place André-Masson
- Place André-Tardieu
- Place des Antilles
- Place d'Anvers
- Place de l'Argonne
- Place Armand-Carrel
- Place Arnault-Tzanck
- Place de l'Assommoir
- Place Auguste-Baron
- Place Auguste-Métivier
- Square de l'Abbé-Georges-Hénocque
- Square de l'Abbé-Esquerre
- Square de l'Abbé-Migne
- Square Adanson
- Square Adolphe-Chérioux
- Square d'Ajaccio
- Square Alban-Satragne
- Square Albert-Besnard
- Square Alberto-Giacometti
- Square Albert-Schweitzer
- Square Albert-Tournaire
- Square Alésia-Ridder
- Square Alexandre 1er de Yougoslavie
- Square Alexandre-et-René-Parodi
- Square Alexandre-Luquet
- Square Alex-Biscarre
- Square Alexis-Clerel de Tocqueville
- Square Alfred-Capus
- Square d'Algérie
- Square d'Alleray - La Quintinie
- Square d'Alleray Labrouste-Saint-Amand
- Square Amadou-Hampate Ba
- Square des Amandiers
- Square de l'Amérique latine
- Square Amiraux-Boinod
- Square André-Lefèbvre
- Square André-Ulmann
- Square Anna-de Noailles
- Square Antoine-Blondin
- Square d'Anvers
- Square des arènes de Lutèce - René-Capitan
- Square Aristide-Cavaillé-Col
- Square de l'Aspirant-Dunand
- Square Auguste-Mariette-Pacha
- Square Auguste-Renoir
- Square aux Artistes

=== B ===
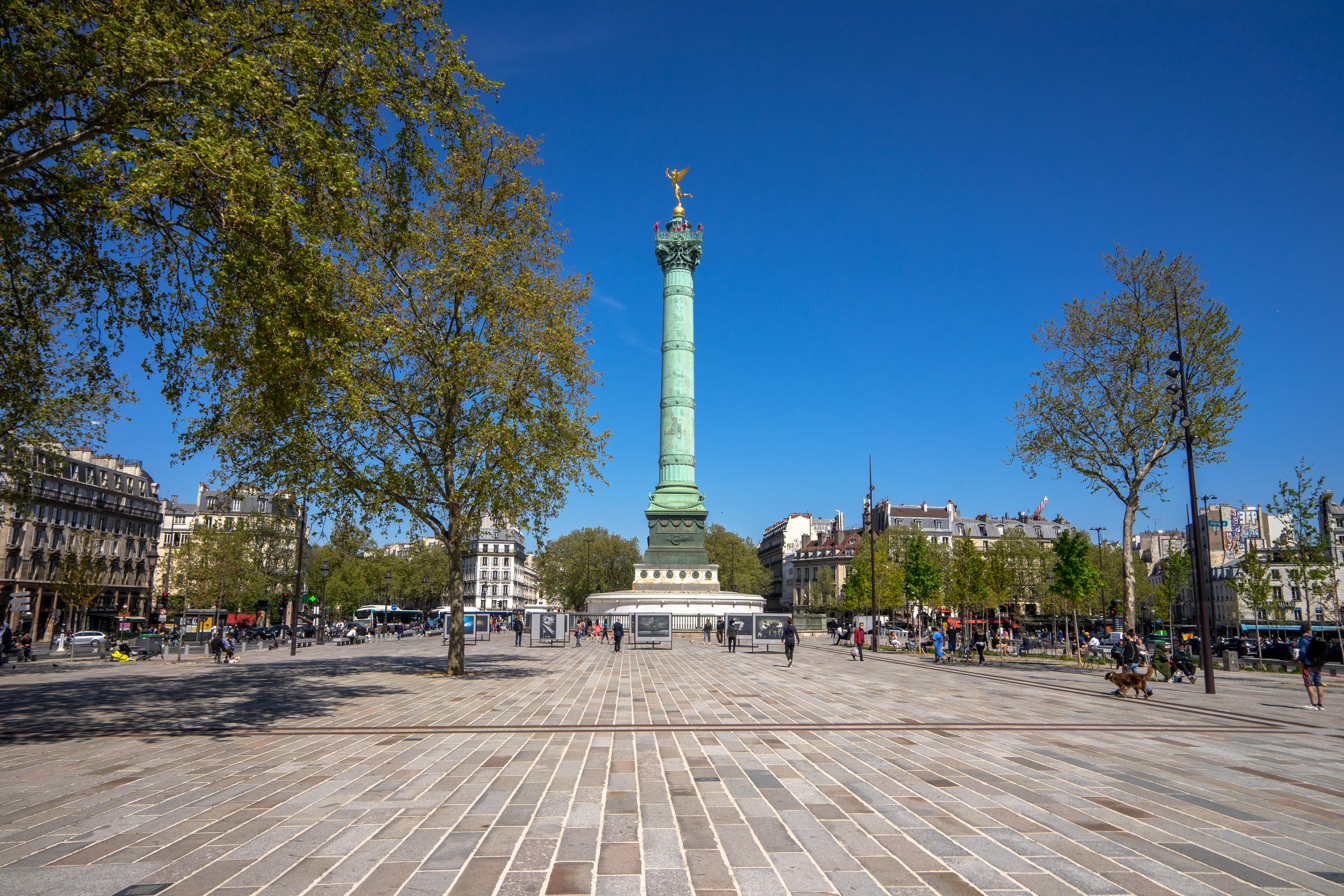
Place de la Bastille, Paris

- Place Balard
- Place de Barcelone
- Place Basse
- Place de la Bastille
- Place de la Bataille-de-Stalingrad
- Place du Bataillon-du-Pacifique
- Place du Bataillon-Français-
  de-l'ONU-en-Corée
- Place Baudoyer
- Place Beauvau
- Place Bernard-Halpern
- Place de Beyrouth
- Place Bienvenüe
- Place de Bitche
- Place Blanche
- Place Boieldieu
- Place de Bolivie
- Place Boulnois
- Place de la Bourse
- Place de Brazzaville
- Place du Brésil
- Place de Breteuil
- Place de Budapest
- Square Barye
- Square du Bataclan
- Square des Batignolles
- Square Bayen
- Square Béla-Bartók
- Square Belleville - Télégraphe
- Square de Berlin
- Square Blomet
- Square Boucicaut
- Square Boulay-Level
- Square Boutroux
- Square Bréguet-Sabin

=== C ===
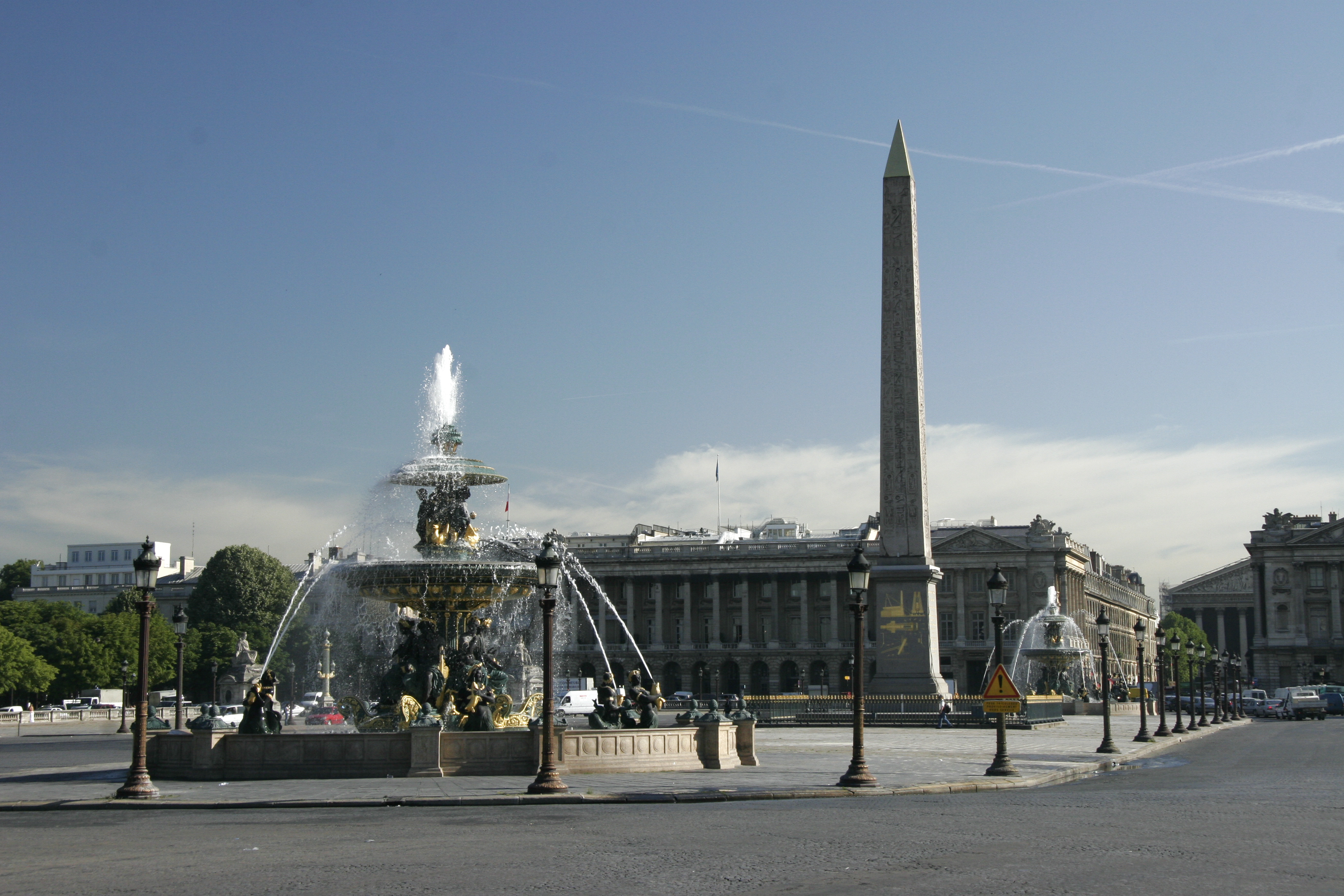
Place de la Concorde, Paris

- Place du Caire
- Place du Calvaire
- Place Cambronne
- Place Camille-Claudel
- Place Camille-Jullian
- Place du Canada
- Place du Cardinal-Amette
- Place du Cardinal-Lavigerie
- Place Carrée
- Place du Carrousel
- Place Casadesus
- Place de Catalogne
- Place du Chancelier-Adenauer
- Place de la Chapelle
- Place Charles-Bernard
- Place Charles de Gaulle
- Place Charles-Dullin
- Place Charles-Fillion
- Place Charles-Garnier
- Place Charles-Michels
- Place Charles-Vallin
- Place Chassaigne-Goyon
- Place du Château-Rouge
- Place du Châtelet
- Place Chopin
- Place des Cinq-Martyrs-du-Lycée-Buffon
- Place Claude-François
- Place Clémenceau
- Place Clément-Ader
- Place de Clichy
- Place Colette
- Place de Colombie
- Place du Colonel-Bourgoin
- Place du Colonel-Fabien
- Place Coluche
- Place des Combattants-en-Afrique-du-Nord
- Place du Commerce
- Place du Comtat-Venaissin
- Place de la Concorde
- Place Constantin-Brâncuși
- Place Constantin-Pecqueur
- Place de la Contrescarpe
- Place de Costa-Rica
- Square Caffiéri
- Square Cambronne
- Square du Caporal Peugeot
- Square du Cardinal Petit de Julleville
- Square du Cardinal Verdier
- Square du Cardinal-Wyszinski
- Square Carlo-Sarrabezolles
- Square Carpeaux
- Square Castagnary
- Square des Chamaillards
- Square du Chanoine-Viollet
- Square Charles-Hermitte
- Square Charles-Péguy
- Square Charles-Victor-Langlois
- Square Claude-Bernard
- Square Claude-Debussy
- Square Claude-Nicolas-Ledoux
- Square du Clos Feuquières
- Square Colbert
- Square Constantin-Pecqueur
- Square Couperin
- Square Courteline
- Square Curial
- Square Cyprian-Norwid

=== D ===
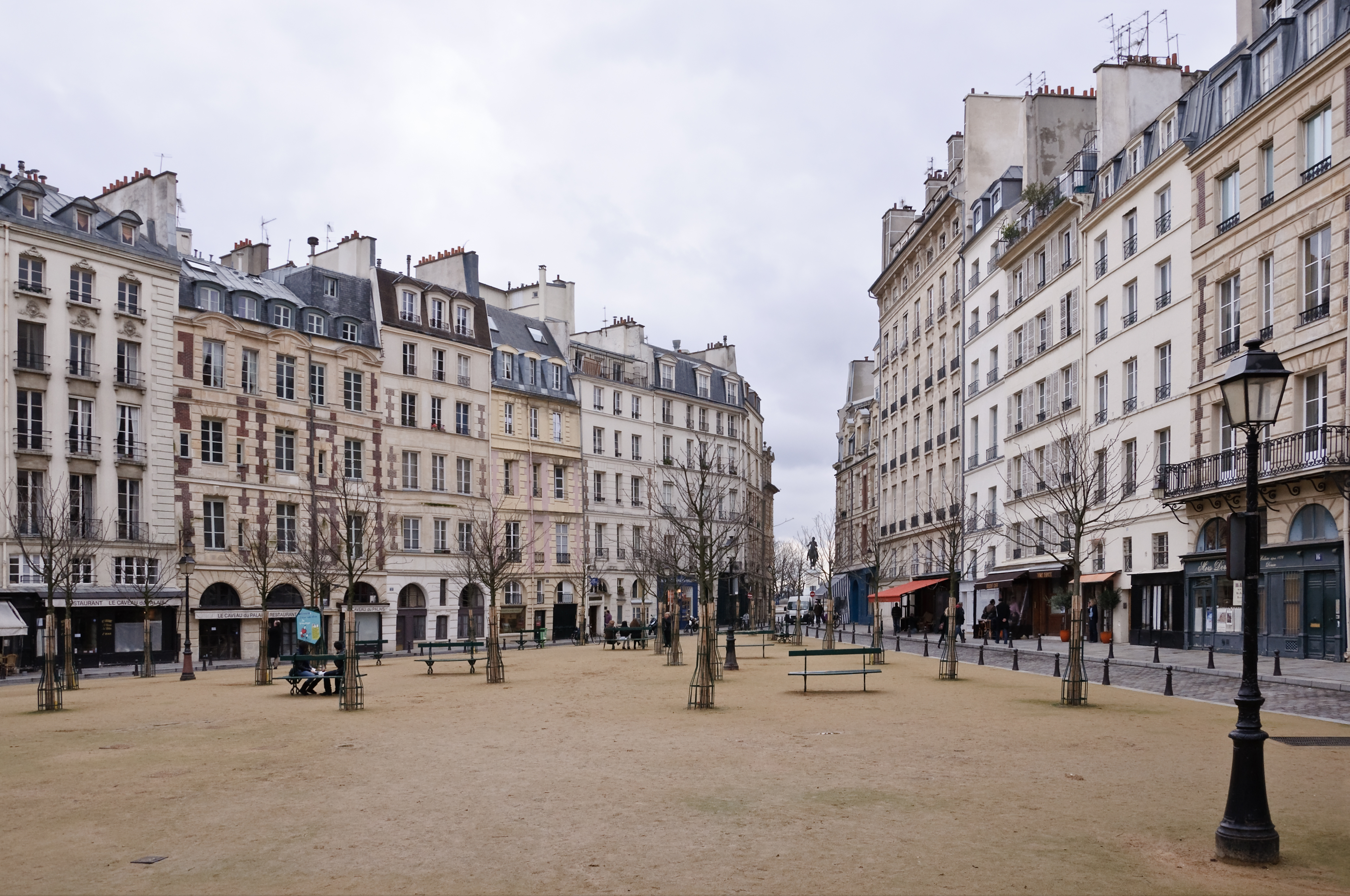
Place Dauphine, Paris

- Place Dalida
- Place Dauphine
- Place Denfert-Rochereau
- Place Denys-Cochin
- Place des Deux-Écus
- Place Diaghilev
- Place du Dix-Neuf-Mars-1962
- Place du
  Docteur-Alfred-Fournier
- Place du
  Docteur-Antoine-Béclère
- Place du
  Docteur-Félix-Lobligeois
- Place du Docteur-Hayem
- Place du Docteur-Navarre
- Place du
  Docteur-Paul-Michaux
- Place du Docteur-Yersin
- Place de Dublin
- Place Dulcie-September
- Place Dupleix
- Square Dampierre-Rouvet
- Square Denis-Poulot
- Square des Deux-Nèthes
- Square du
  docteur Antoine-Béclère
- Square du docteur Calmette
- Square du Docteur Grancher
- Square du Docteur Navarre
- Square du docteur Variot
- Square des docteurs Dejérine
- Square Dupleix
- Square Duranton

=== E ===
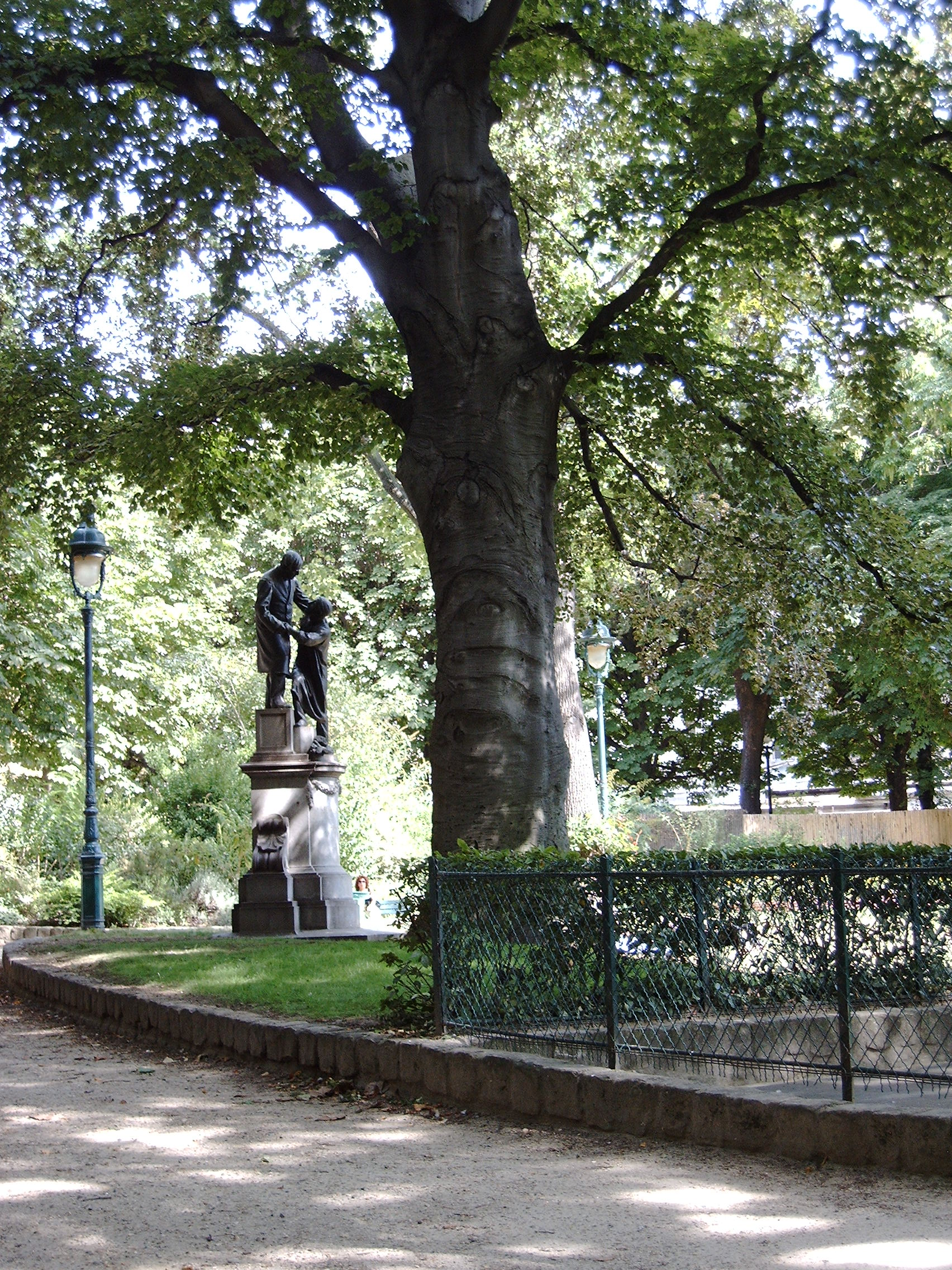
Square des Épinettes, Paris

- Place de l'École
- Place de l'École-Militaire
- Place de l'Édit-de-Nantes
- Place Édith-Piaf
- Place Edmond-Michelet
- Place Edmond-Rostand
- Place Édouard-Renard
- Place Édouard-VII
- Place de l'Église-d'Auteuil
- Place de l'Église-de-L'Assomption
- Place El-Salvador
- Place Émile-Goudeau
- Place Émile-Landrin
- Place Émile-Mâle
- Place Emmanuel-Levinas
- Place Ernest-Denis
- Place de l'Escadrille-Normandie-Niemen
- Place d'Estienne-d'Orves
- Place de l'Estrapade
- Place des États-Unis
- Place Étienne-Pernet
- Place de l'Europe
- Square des Écrivains-Combattants-Morts-pour-la-France
- Square Édouard-Vaillant
- Square de l'église Notre-Dame-de-la-Croix
- Square Élisa-Borey
- Square Émile-Borel
- Square Émile-Chautemps
- Square Émile-Cohl
- Square Emmanuel-Fleury
- Square des Épinettes
- Square Ernest-Chausson
- Square d'Estienne d'Orves
- Square Eugène-Varlin
- Square Eugénie-Cotton
- Square de l'Évangile

=== F ===
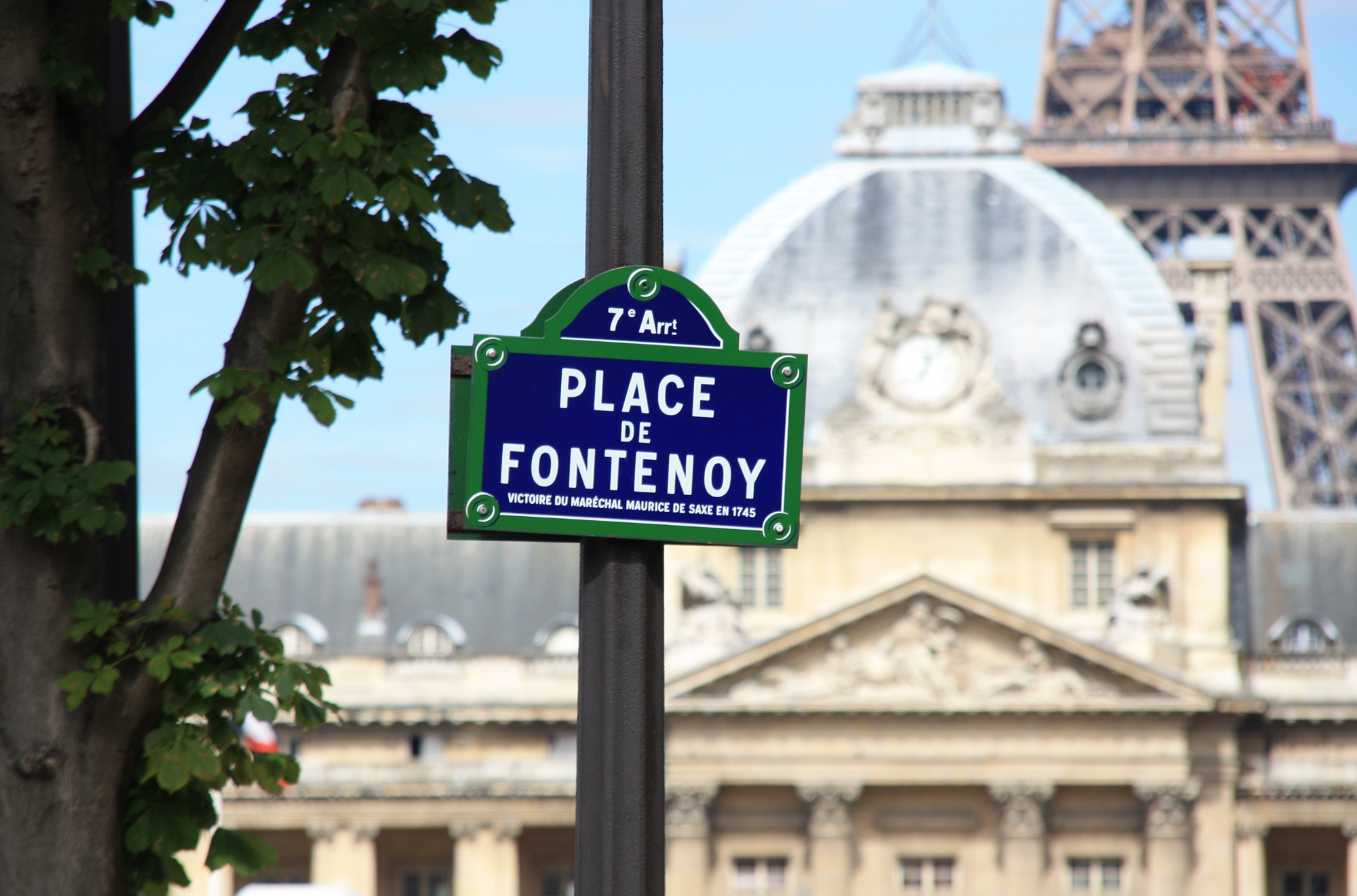
Place de Fontenoy, Paris

- Place Falguière
- Place Félix-Éboué
- Place Ferdinand-Brunot
- Place Fernand-Mourlot
- Place des Fêtes
- Place de Finlande
- Place de la Fontaine-aux-Lions
- Place de Fontenoy
- Place Francis-Poulenc
- Place François-Ier
- Place Franz-Liszt
- Place Fréhel
- Place Fürstenberg
- Square Félix-Desruelles
- Square Félix-Faure
- Square Ferdinand-Brunot
- Square Florence-Blumenthal
- Square de la Folie-Régnault
- Square de la Fondation Rothschild
- Square Francis-Lemarque
- Square Francis-Poulenc
- Square Frédéric-Bazille
- Square Frédérick-Lemaître
- Square Frédéric-Rossif

=== G ===
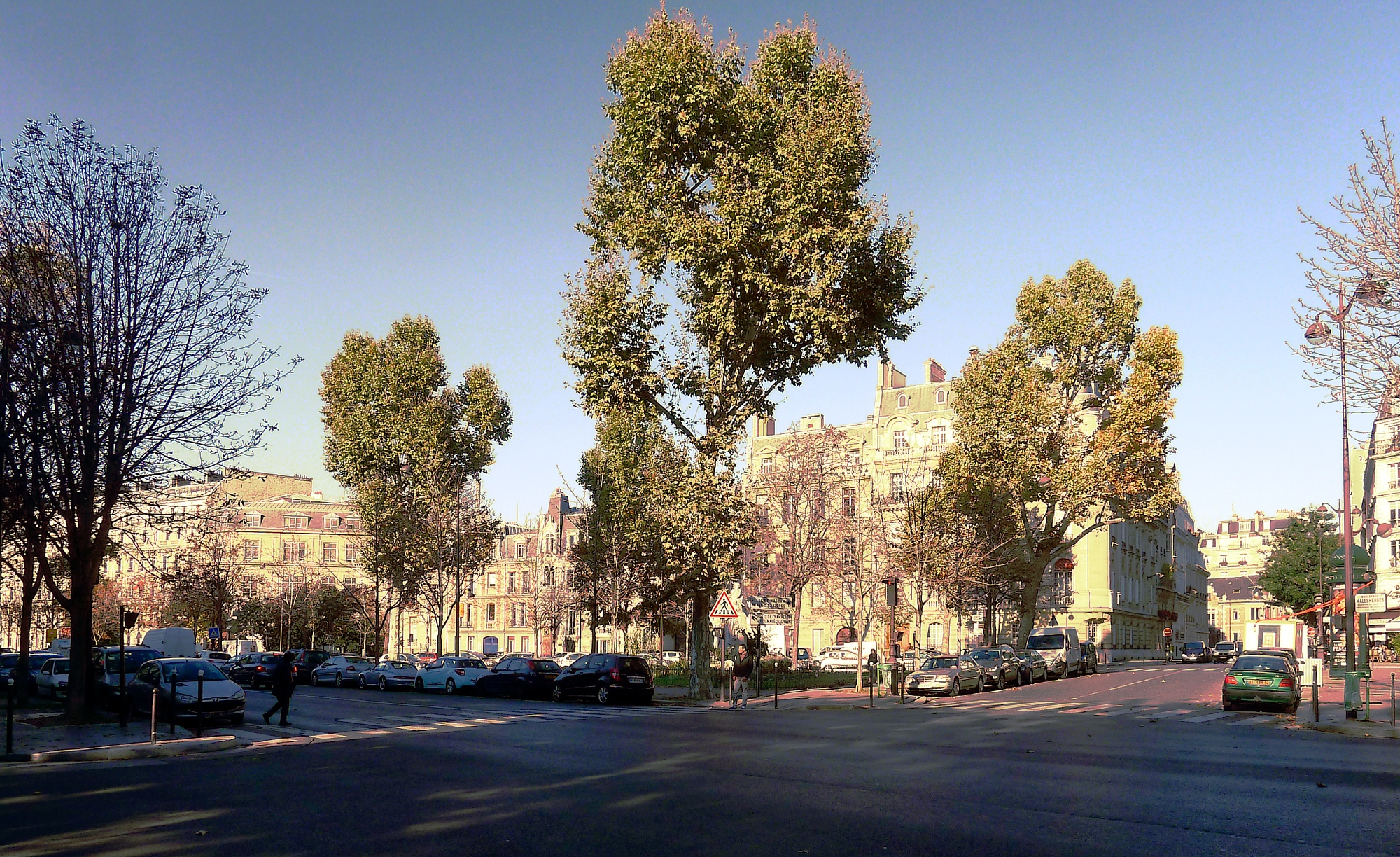
Place du Général-Catroux, Paris

- Place Gabriel-Péri
- Place Gaillon
- Place Gambetta
- Place de la Garenne
- Place du Général-Beuret
- Place du Général-Brocard
- Place du Général-Catroux
- Place du Général-Cochet
- Place du Général-Gouraud
- Place du Général-Ingold
- Place du Général-Koenig
- Place du Général-Monclar
- Place du Général-Patton
- Place du Général-Stefanik
- Place du Général-Tessier-de-Marguerittes
- Place des Généraux-de-Trentinian
- Place Georges-Berry
- Place Georges-Guillaumin
- Place Georges-Mulot
- Place Georges-Pompidou
- Place Gilbert-Perroy
- Place Goldoni
- Place des Grès
- Place du Guatemala
- Place du Guignier
- Place Gustave-Toudouze
- Square Gabriel-Pierne
- Square Garibaldi
- Square Gaston-Baty
- Square du Général-Anselin
- Square Georges-Méliès
- Square Georges-Cain
- Square Gerber
- Square Georges-Lamarque
- Square Ginette-Neveu
- Square Godefroy-Cavaignac
- Square des Grès
- Square Gustave-Mesureur

=== H ===
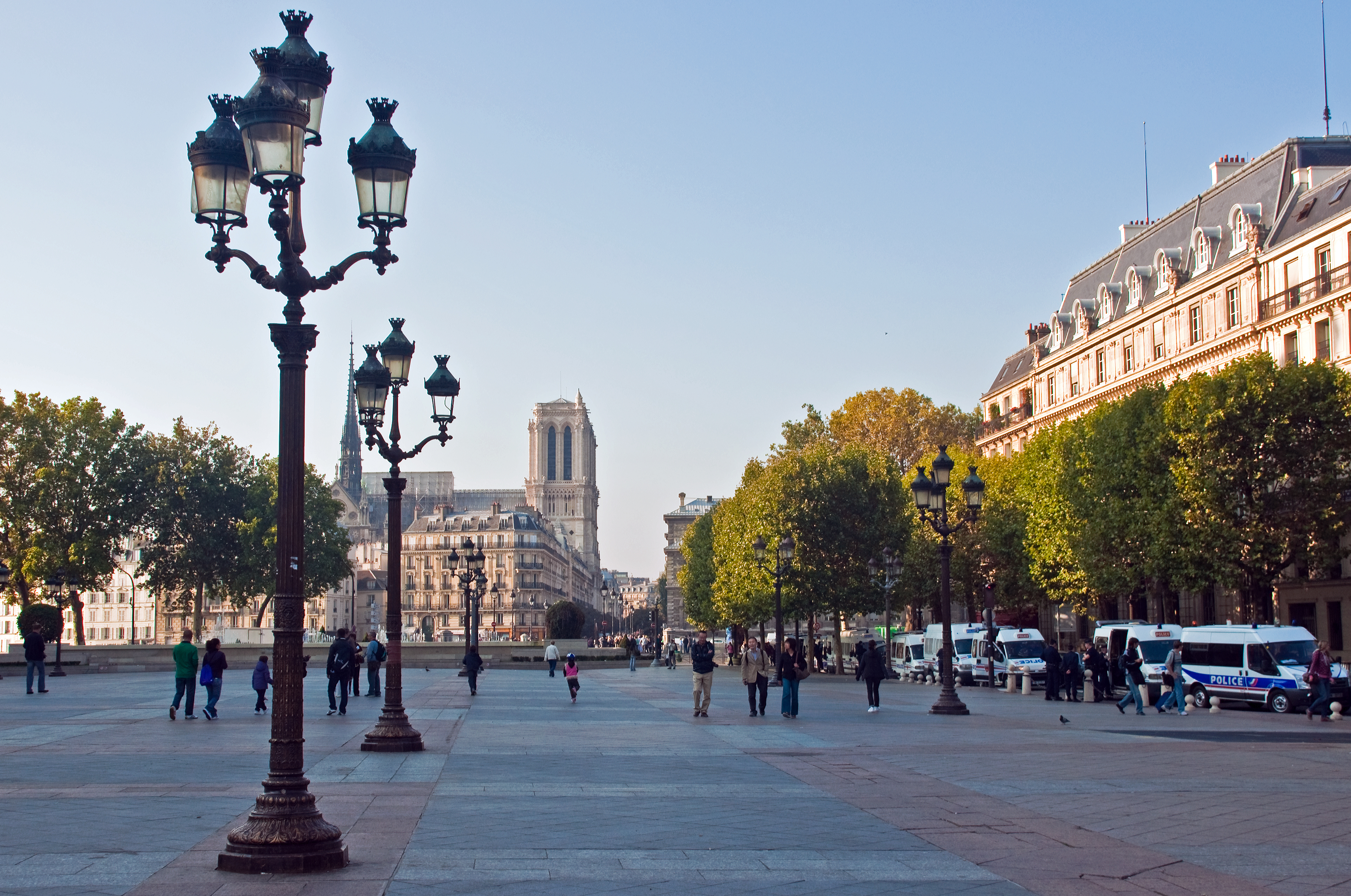
Place de l'Hôtel-de-Ville, Paris

- Place du Havre
- Place Hébert
- Place Henri-Bergson
- Place Henri-Frenay
- Place Henri-Langlois
- Place Henri-Matisse
- Place Henri-Mondor
- Place Henri-Queuille
- Place Henri-Rollet
- Place Henry-de-Montherlant
- Place Henry-Dunant
- Place de l'Hôtel-de-Ville
- Place Hubert-Monmarché
- Square Hector-Berlioz
- Square Hélène-Boucher
- Square Héloïse et Abélard
- Square Henri et Achille-Duchène
- Square Henri-Bataille
- Square Henri-Cadiou
- Square Henri-Christiné
- Square Henri-Collet
- Square Henri-Galli
- Square Henri-Huchard
- Square Henri-Karcher
- Square Henri-Rousselle
- Square Honoré-Champion

=== I ===
- Place d'Iéna
- Place Igor-Stravinsky
- Place de l'Île-de-la-Réunion
- Place de l'Île-de-Sein
- Place de l'Institut
- Place des Insurgés-de-Varsovie
- Place des Invalides
- Place d'Israël
- Place d'Italie
- Square de l'île de France

=== J ===
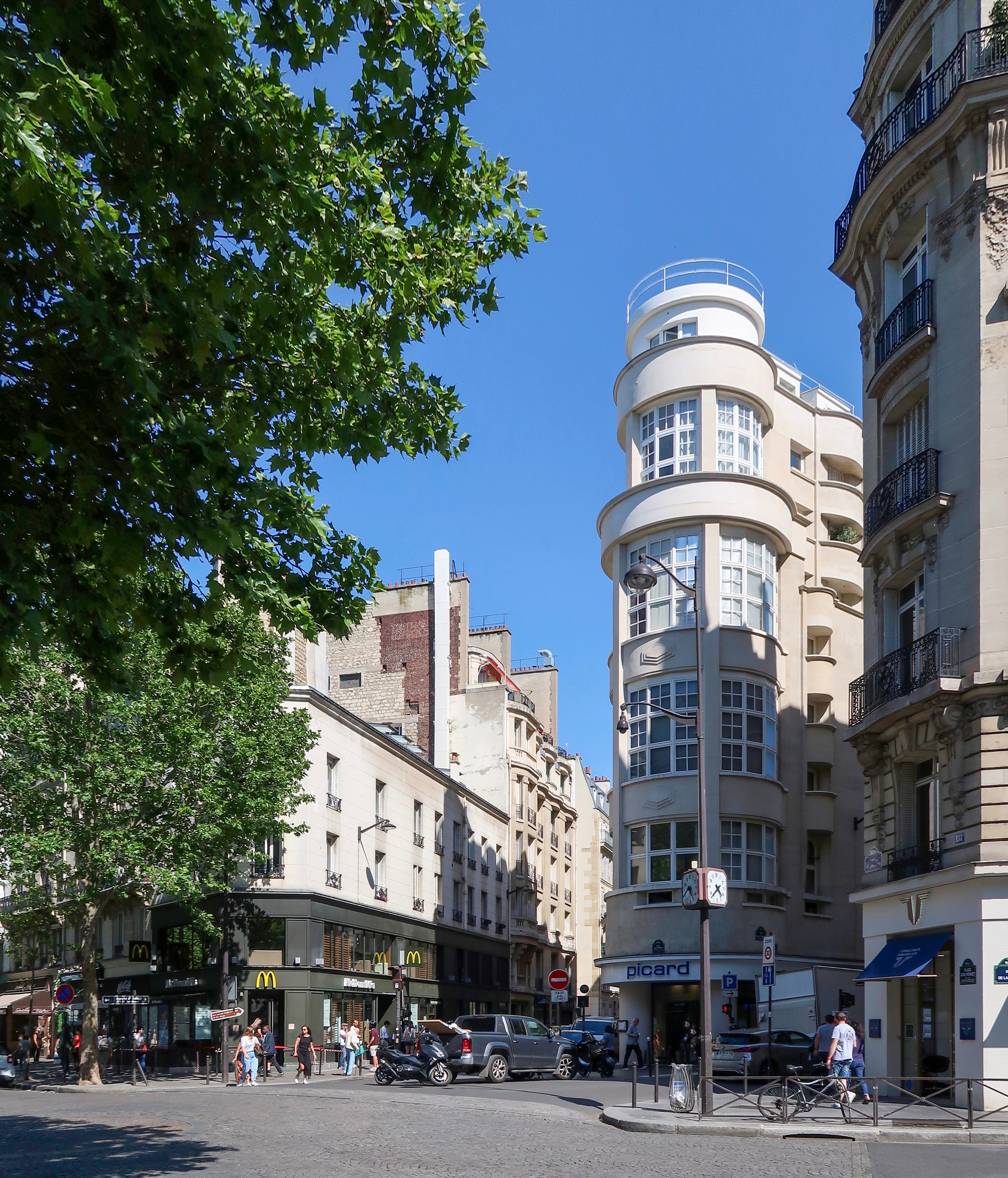
Place Jean-Monnet, Paris

- Place Jacob-Kaplan
- Place Jacques-Bainville
- Place Jacques-Bonsergent
- Place Jacques-Copeau
- Place Jacques-Debu-Bridel
- Place Jacques-Demy
- Place Jacques-et-Thérèse-Tréfouel
- Place Jacques-Froment
- Place Jacques-Marette
- Place Jacques-Rouché
- Place Jacques-Rueff
- Place Jan-Karski
- Place Jean-Baptiste-Clément
- Place Jean-Lorrain
- Place Jean-Marais
- Place Jean-Monnet
- Place Jeanne d'arc
- Place Jean-Paul II
- Place Jean-Paul-Sartre
  -et-Simone-de-Beauvoir
- Place Jean-Rostand
- Place Jean-Vilar
- Place Joachim-du-Bellay
- Place Joffre
- Place Johann-Strauss
- Place de Joinville
- Place José-Marti
- Place Joséphine-Baker
- Place José-Rizal
- Place Jules-Hénaffe
- Place Jules-Joffrin
- Place Jules-Renard
- Place Jules-Rimet
- Place Jules-Senard
- Place Jussieu
- Square Jacques-Antoine
- Square Jacques-Audiberti
- Square Jacques-Bidault
- Square Jan-Doornik
- Square Jean-XXIII
- Square Jean-Aicard
- Square Jean-Cocteau
- Square Jean-Leclaire
- Square Jean-Morin
- Square Jean-Moulin
- Square Jehan-Rictus
- Square Jérôme-Bellat
- Square de Jessaint
- Square des Jonquilles
- Square Jules-Ferry
- Square Julia-Bartet
- Square Juliette-Dodu

=== K ===
- Place Kossuth
- Place de Kyōto

=== L ===
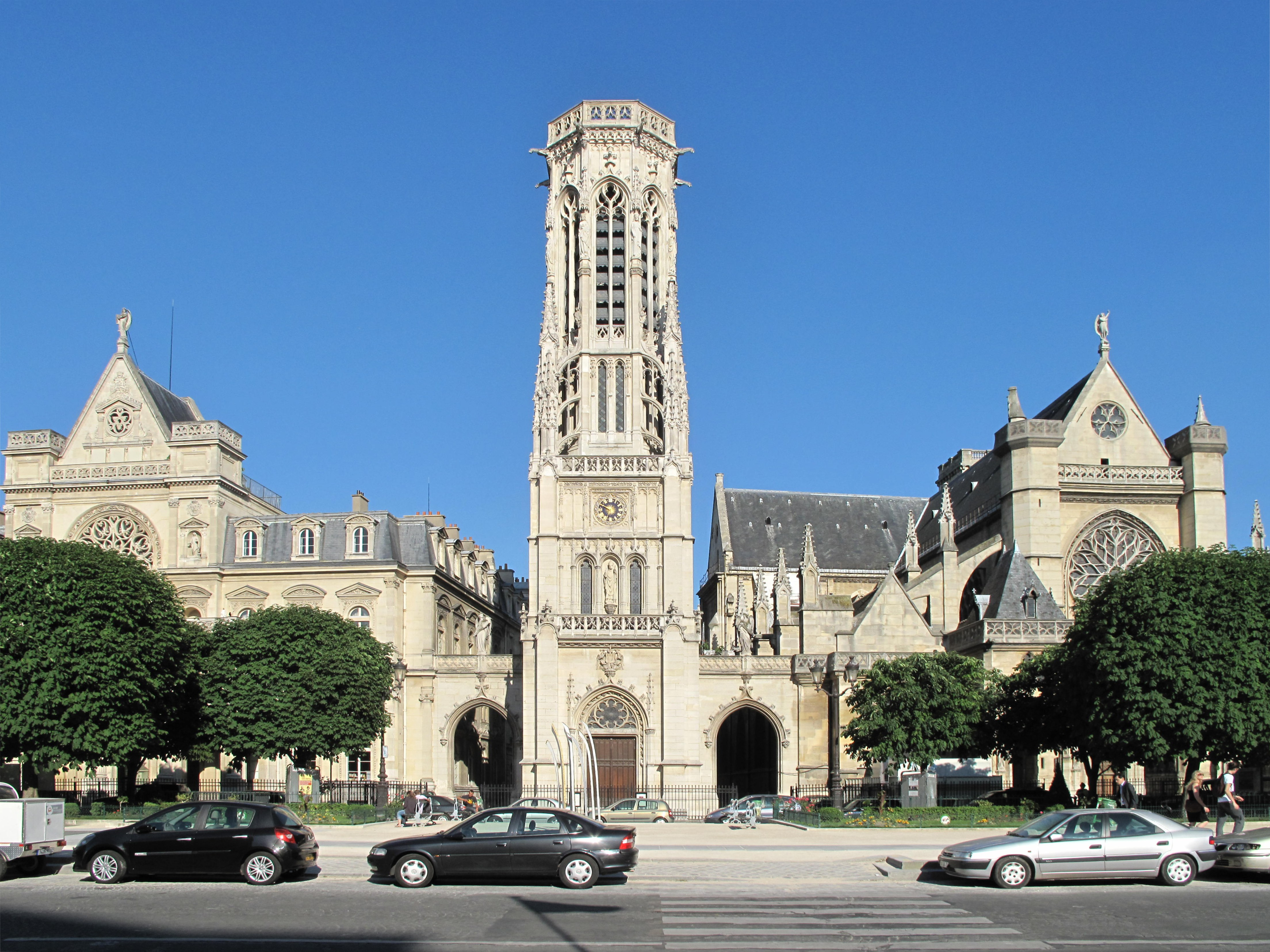
Place du Louvre, Paris

- Place Lachambeaudie
- Place Le Corbusier
- Place Léonard-Bernstein
- Place Léon-Blum
- Place Léon-Deubel
- Place Léon-Paul-Fargue
- Place de Lévis
- Place du Lieutenant-Stéphane-Piobetta
- Place Lili-Boulanger
- Place Lino-Ventura
- Place Louis-Armand
- Place Louis-Armstrong
- Place Louis-Lépine
- Place Louis-Marin
- Place du Louvre
- Place Lucien-Herr
- Square Lamartine
- Square Laurent-Prache
- Square Léon
- Square Léon-Frapié
- Square Léon-Gaumont
- Square Léon-Serpollet
- Square Léopold-Achille
- Square Louis XIII
- Square Louis XVI
- Square Louise-de Marillac
- Square Louise-Michel
- Square Louis-Lumière
- Square Louis-Majorelle
- Square Louvois
- Square Lucien-Fontanarosa

=== M ===
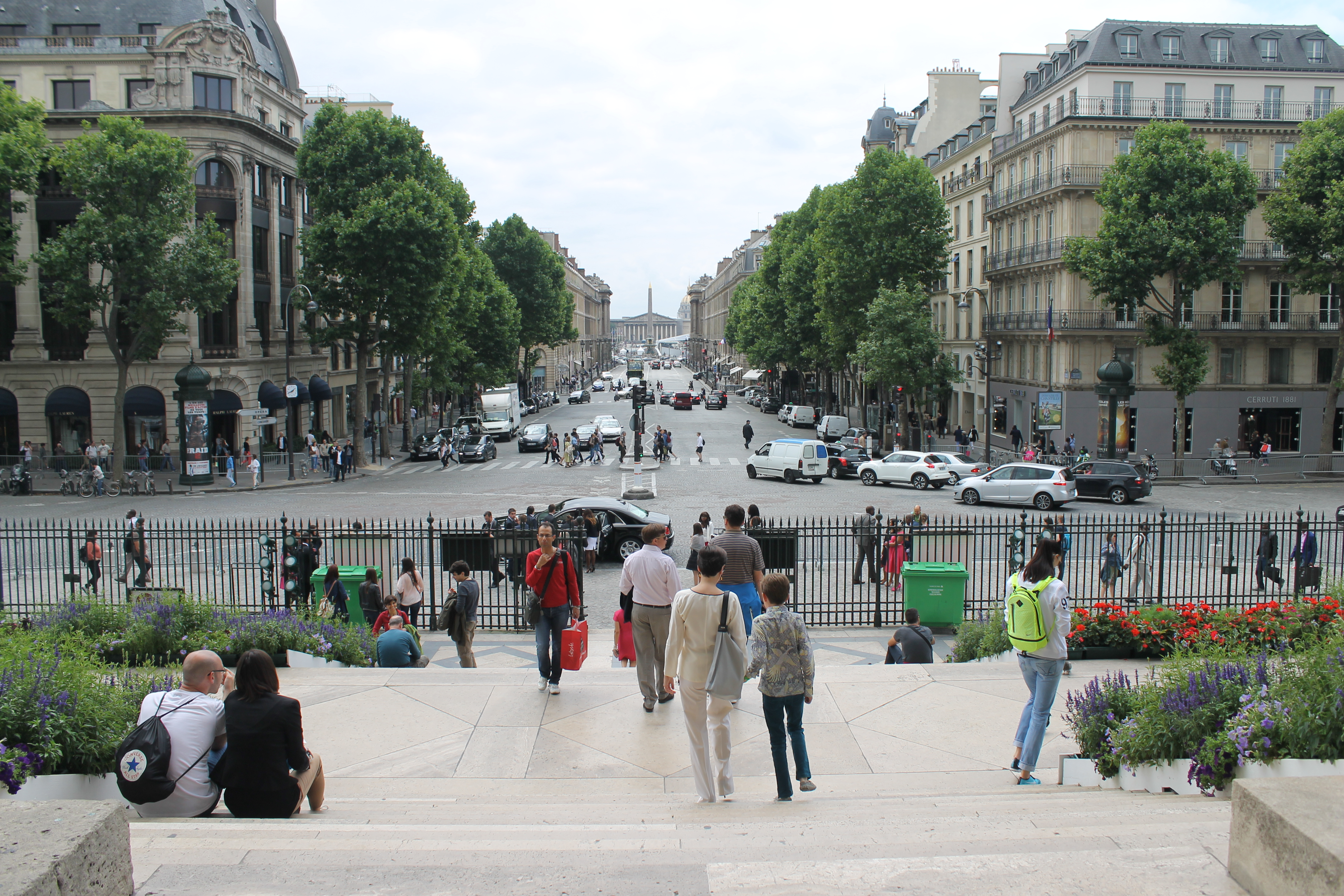
Place de la Madeleine and Rue Royale, Paris

- Carré Marigny
- Place de la Madeleine
- Place du Maquis-du-Vercors
- Place Marc-Bloch
- Place Marcel-Achard
- Place Marcel-Aymé
- Place Marcel-Cerdan
- Place Marcelin-Berthelot
- Place Marcel-Paul
- Place du Marché-Sainte-Catherine
- Place du Marché-Saint-Honoré
- Place du Maréchal-
  de-Lattre-de-Tassigny
- Place du Maréchal-Juin
- Place Marguerite-de-Navarre
- Place Maria-Callas
- Place Marie-de-Miribel
- Place Marie-Madeleine-Fourcade
- Place du Maroc
- Place Martin-Nadaud
- Place des Martyrs-de-la-Résistance-
  de-la-Porte-de-Sèvres
- Place des Martyrs-
  Juifs-du-Vélodrome-d'Hiver
- Place Maubert
- Place Maurice-Barrès
- Place Maurice-Chevalier
- Place Maurice-de-Fontenay
- Place Maurice-Quentin
- Place Mazas
- Place de Ménilmontant
- Place de Mexico
- Place Michel-Audiard
- Place Monge
- Place Monseigneur-Loutil
- Place de la Montagne-du-Goulet
- Place de Moro-Giafferi
- Square de la Madone
- Square de la mairie du 12e
- Square Marcel-Bleustein-Blanchet
- Square Marcel-Mouloudji
- Square Marcel-Pagnol
- Square Marcel-Sembat
- Square Marc-Seguin
- Square Marguerite-Long
- Square Marie-Curie
- Square Marie-Trintignant
- Square de la Marseillaise
- Square Maurice-Gardette
- Square Maurice-Kriegel-Valrimont
- Square de Ménilmontant
  et des Saint-Simoniens
- Square Mercœur
- Square des Missions Étrangères
- Square Monseigneur Maillet
- Square du Mont Cenis
- Square de la Montgolfière
- Square Montholon
- Square de la Moskowa
- Square des Mûriers

=== N ===
- Place Napoléon-III
- Place de Narvik
- Place de la Nation
- Place Nationale
- Place Nattier
- Place du Nicaragua
- Square Nadar
- Square Necker

=== O ===
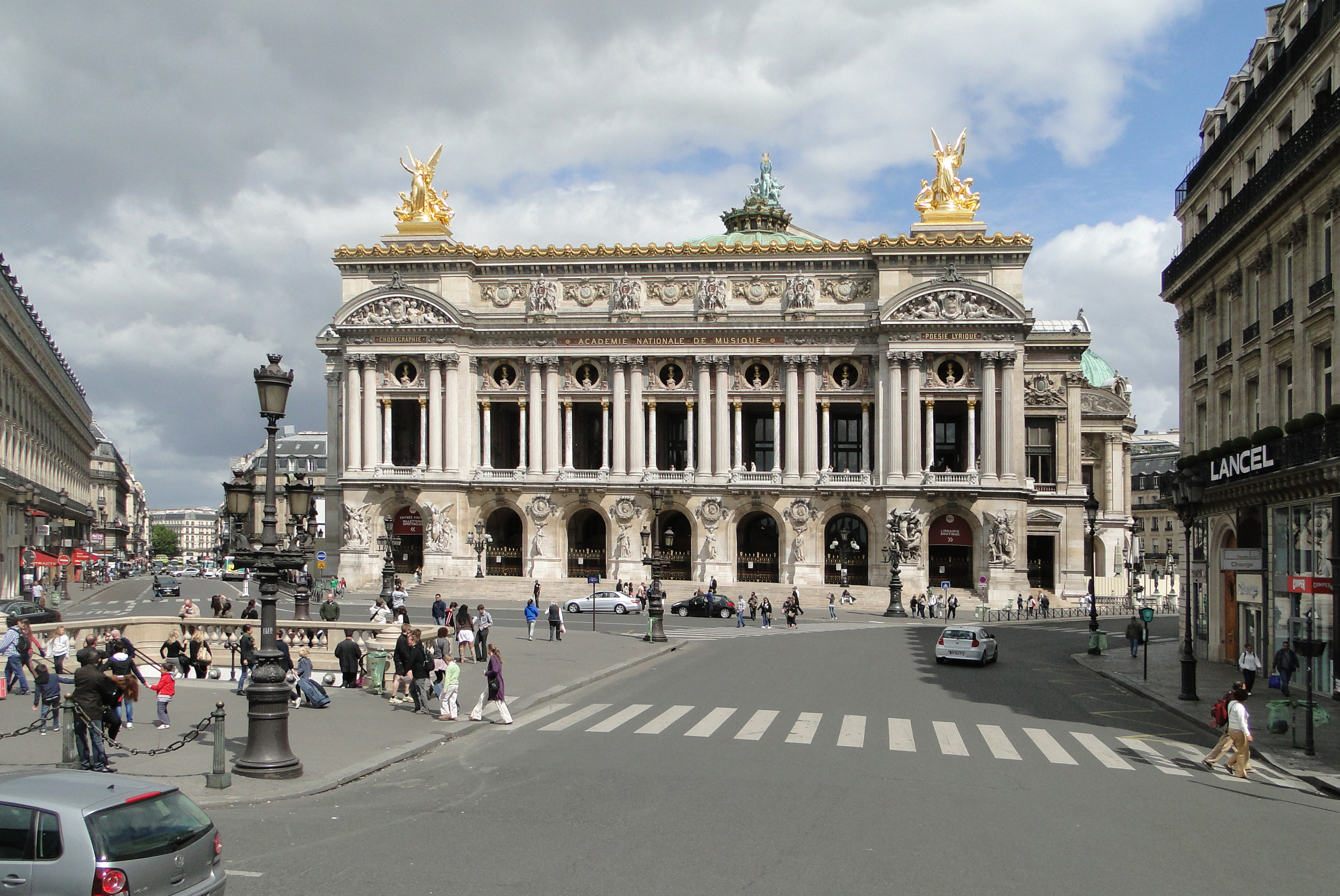
Place de l'Opéra, Paris

- Place Octave-Chanute
- Place de l'Odéon
- Place de l'Opéra
- Place Ozanam
- Square Olivier-Noyer-Leonidas
- Square des Ormeaux
- Square Ozanam

=== P ===
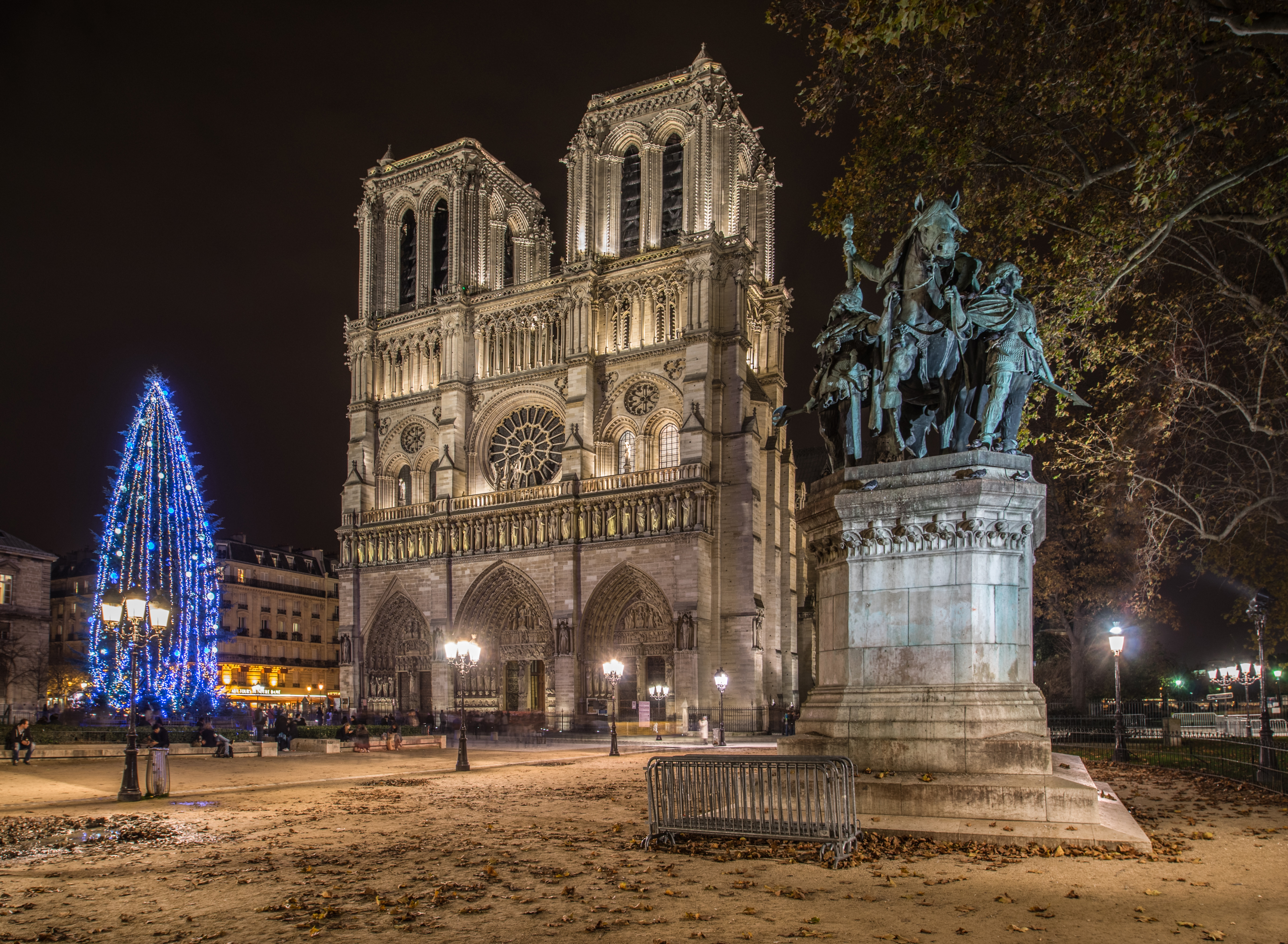
Parvis Notre-Dame – Place Jean-Paul-II, Paris

- Parvis Notre-Dame – Place Jean-Paul-II
- Place Pablo-Picasso
- Place du Palais-Bourbon
- Place du Palais-Royal
- Place du Panthéon
- Place du Paraguay
- Place Pasdeloup
- Place de Passy
- Place Paul-Beauregard
- Place Paul-Claudel
- Place Paul-Éluard
- Place Paul-Léautaud
- Place Paul-Painlevé
- Place Paul-Reynaud
- Place Paul-Signac
- Place Paul-Verlaine
- Place du Père-Chaillet
- Place du Père-Marcellin-Champagnat
- Place du Père-Teilhard-de-Chardin
- Place du Pérou
- Place du Petit-Pont
- Place des Petits-Pères
- Place Pierre-Brisson
- Place Pierre-Dux
- Place Pierre-Emmanuel
- Place Pierre-Lafue
- Place Pierre-Lampué
- Place Pierre-Lazareff
- Place Pierre-Mac-Orlan
- Place Pierre-Vaudrey
- Place Pigalle
- Place Pinel
- Place du Pont-Neuf
- Place de Port-au-Prince
- Place de la Porte-d'Auteuil
- Place de la
  Porte-de-Bagnolet
- Place de la
  Porte-de-Champerret
- Place de la
  Porte-de-Châtillon
- Place de la
  Porte-de-Montreuil
- Place de la Porte-de-Pantin
- Place de la Porte-de-Passy
- Place de la
  Porte-de-Saint-Cloud
- Place de la Porte-de-Vanves
- Place de la
  Porte-de-Versailles
- Place de la Porte-Maillot
- Place de la Porte-Molitor
- Place Possoz
- Place du Président-Édouard-Herriot
- Place du Président-Mithouard
- Place Prosper-Goubaux
- Place du Puits-de-L'Ermite
- Place des Pyramides
- Square Pablo-Casals
- Square Paganini
- Square de la Paix
- Square du palais Galliera
- Square du passage Moncey
- Square Paul-Gilot
- Square Paul-Grimault
- Square Paul-Langevin
- Square Paul-Painlevé
- Square Paul-Paray
- Square Paul-Robin
- Square Pauly
- Square des Périchaux
- Square Petit
- Square du Petit Bois
- Square Pierre-de-Gaulle
- Square de la place André-Masson
- Square de la Place-Dauphine
- Square de la place de Bitche
- Square de la place de la Bataille de Stalingrad
- Square de la place de la Nation
- Square de la place de la Réunion
- Square de la place d'Italie
- Square de la place du Commerce
- Square de la place Étienne Pernet
- Square de la place Pasdeloup
- Square des Poètes
- Square du port de l'Hôtel de Ville
- Square de la Porte de la Plaine
- Square de la Porte de la Villette

=== Q ===
- Place du Québec
- Square du quai de la Gironde
- Square du quai de la Loire
- Square du quai de la Seine

=== R ===
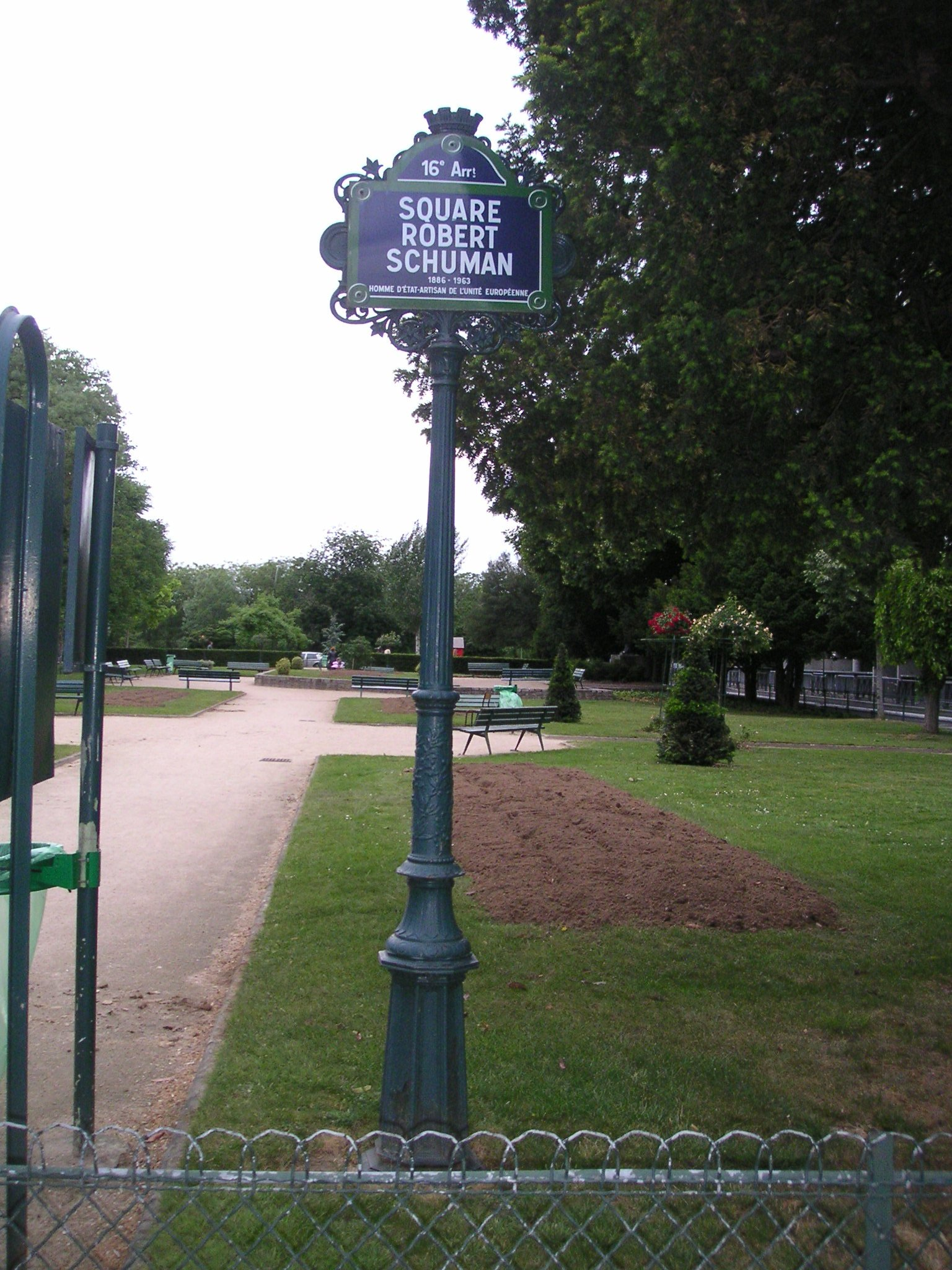
Square Robert Schuman, Paris

- Place Raoul-Dautry
- Place Raoul-Follereau
- Place de la Reine-Astrid
- Place René-Cassin
- Place de la République
- Place de la République-de-L'Équateur
- Place de la République-de-Panamá
- Place de la République-Dominicaine
- Place de la Résistance
- Place de la Réunion
- Place de Rhin-et-Danube
- Place Richard-Baret
- Place Richard-de-Coudenhove-Kalergi
- Place de Rio-de-Janeiro
- Place Robert-Desnos
- Place Robert-Guillemard
- Place Rochambeau
- Place Rodin
- Place de la Rotonde
- Place de Roubaix
- Place de Rungis
- Place Rutebeuf
- Square Rachmaninov
- Square Raoul-Follereau
- Square Raoul-Nordling
- Square Raymond-Queneau
- Square Raymond-Souplex
- Square Rébeval
- Square des Recollets
- Square Réjane
- Square René-Le Gall
- Square René Viviani
- Square Robert-Bajac
- Square Robert-Blache
- Square Robert-Montagne
- Square Robert-Schuman
- Square Roger-Stéphane
- Square de la Roquette
- Square de la rue Ortolan

=== S ===
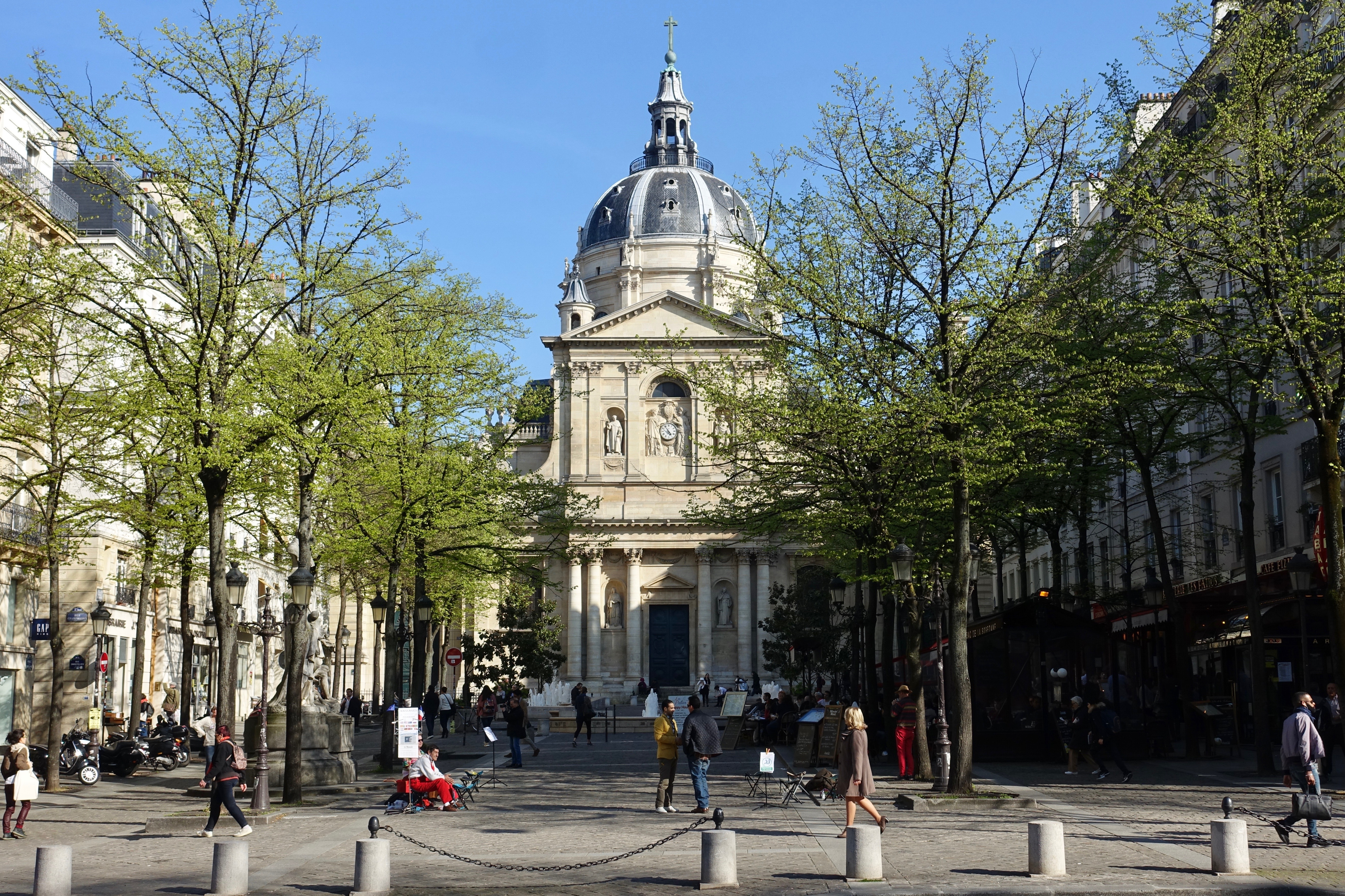
Place de la Sorbonne, Paris

- Place Saint-André-des-Arts
- Place Saint-Augustin
- Place Saint-Blaise
- Place Saint-Charles
- Place Sainte-Geneviève
- Place Sainte-Marthe
- Place Sainte-Opportune
- Place Saint-Estèphe
- Place Saint-Fargeau
- Place Saint-Ferdinand
- Place Saint-Georges
- Place Saint-Germain-des-Prés
- Place Saint-Gervais
- Place Saint-Jacques
- Place Saint-Jean
- Place Saint-Michel
- Place Saint-Pierre
- Place Saint-Sulpice
- Place Saint-Thomas-d'Aquin
- Place de Santiago-du-Chili
- Place des Saussaies
- Place de Séoul
- Place Skanderbeg
- Place de la Sorbonne
- Place Souham
- Place Stuart-Merrill
- Place Suzanne-Valadon
- Square Saint-Ambroise
- Square Saint-Bernard
- Square Sainte-Hélène
- Square Saint-Éloi
- Square Sainte-Odile
- Square Saint-Gilles - Grand Veneur
- Square Saint-Lambert
- Square Saint-Laurent
- Square Saint-Médard
- Square de la Salamandre
- Square Samuel-De-Champlain
- Square Samuel-Rousseau
- Square Santiago du Chili
- Square Sarah-Bernhardt
- Square Scipion
- Square du Serment-de-Koufra
- Square Séverine
- Square Sorbier
- Square Suzanne-Buisson

=== T ===
- Place Tattegrain
- Place des Ternes
- Place du Tertre
- Place Théodore-Rivière
- Place de Thorigny
- Place de Tokyo
- Place de Torcy
- Place Tristan-Bernard
- Place du Trocadéro-et-du-11-Novembre
- Square Taras-Chevtchenko
- Square du Tchad
- Square du Temple
- Square Thomas-Jefferson
- Square Tolstoï
- Square de la tour Saint-Jacques
- Square Trousseau

=== U ===
- Place de l'Uruguay
- Square Ulysse-Trélat

=== V ===
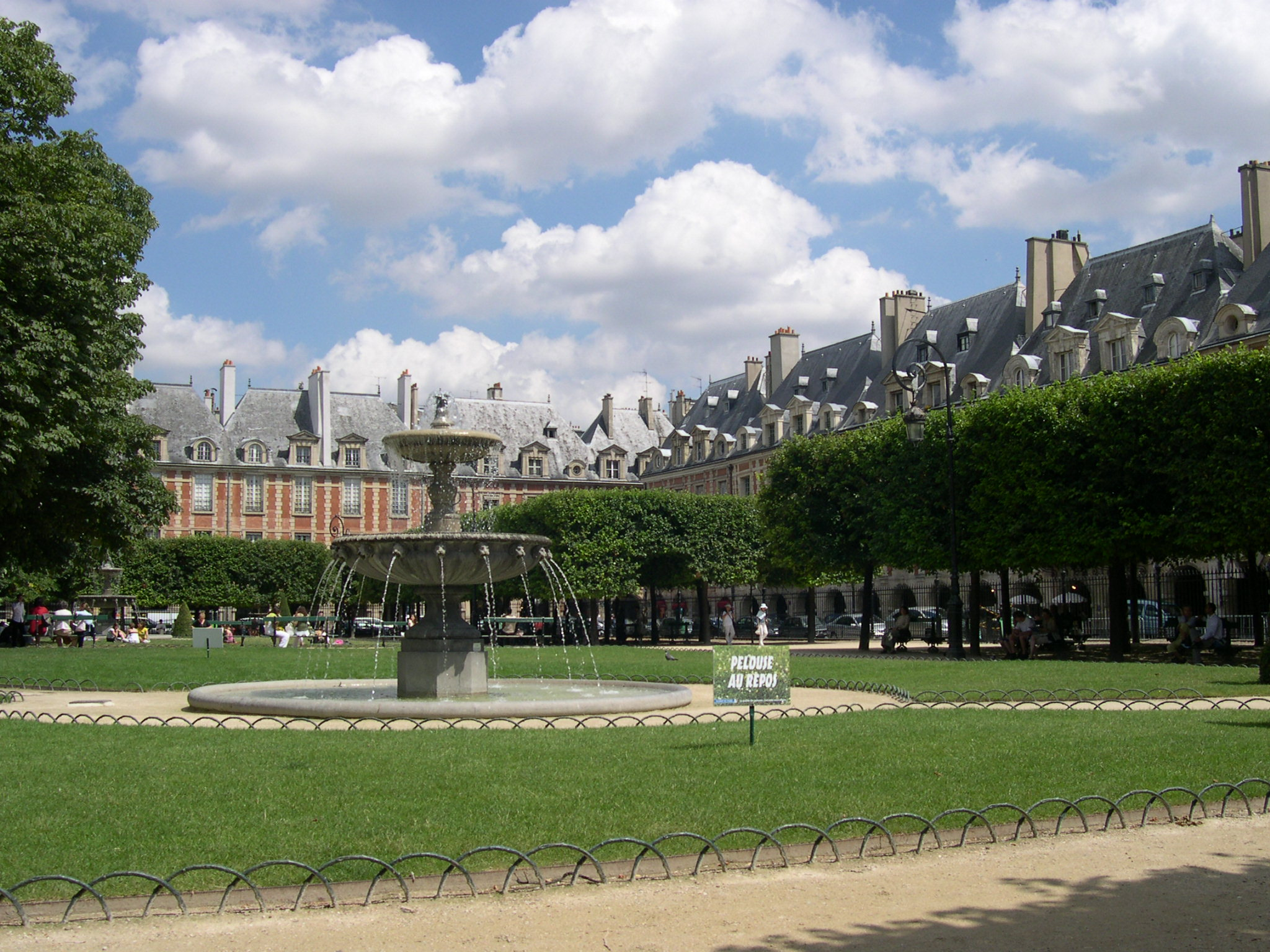
Place des Vosges, Paris

- Place de Valenciennes
- Place Valhubert
- Place de Valois
- Place de Varsovie
- Place Vauban
- Place Vendôme
- Place de Vénétie
- Place du Vénézuela
- Place de Verdun
- Place des Victoires
- Place Victor-et-Hélène-Basch
- Place Victor-Hugo
- Place des Vins-de-France
- Place Violet
- Place des Vosges
- Square Van Vollenhoven
- Square du Vert-Galant
- Square Villa Sainte-Croix
- Square Violet

=== W ===
- Place de Wagram
- Place Wassily-Kandinsky

=== Y ===
- Place Yvon-et-Claire-Morandat
- Square de Yorktown

== See also ==
- Paris
- Arrondissements of Paris
- List of parks and gardens in Paris
