= Ferdinand Brunot =

French linguist and philologist

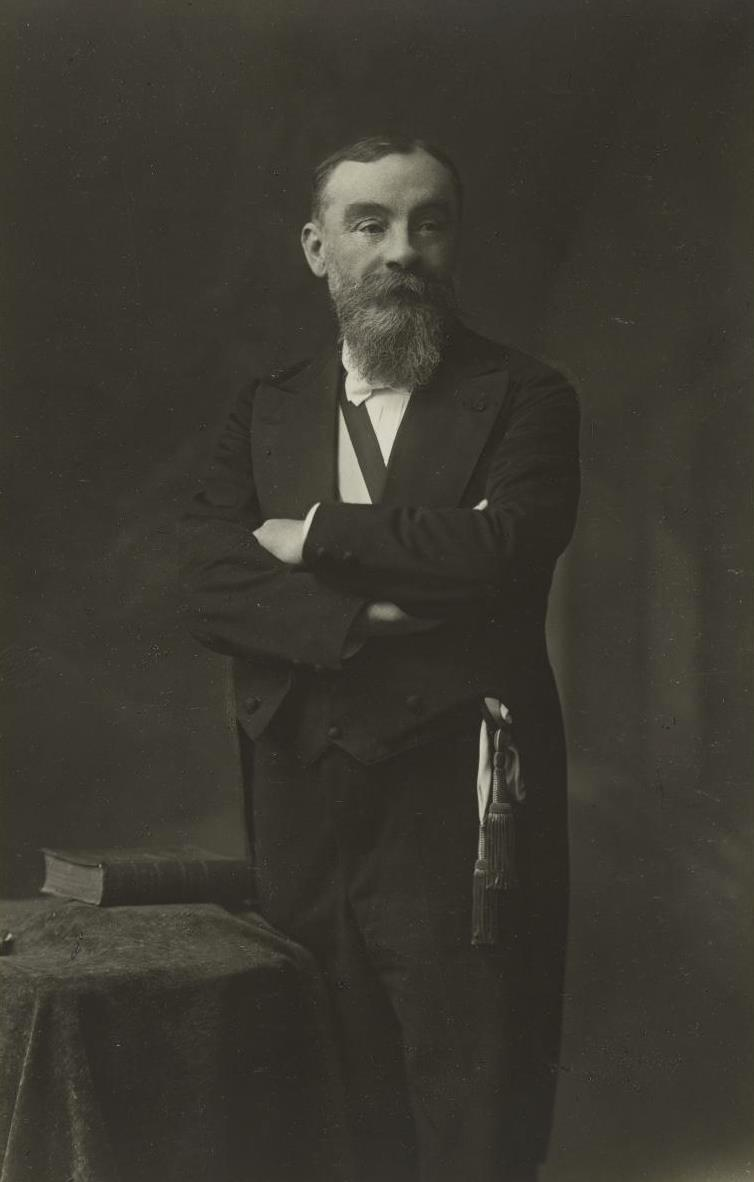
Ferdinand Brunot (1919)

Ferdinand-Eugène-Jean-Baptiste Brunot (French: [fɛʁdinɑ̃ bʁyno]; 6 November 1860 – 7 January 1938) was a French linguist and philologist, editor of the ground-breaking Histoire de la langue française des origines à 1900 ("History of the French Language from its Origins to 1900").

== Biography ==
Brunot was born in Saint-Dié-des-Vosges. He found his first faculty position and published his first book from the Faculté des lettres de Lyon, now the Lumière University Lyon 2. In October 1891 he became a lecturer at the University of Paris at the age of 31. Here he began his long collaboration with fellow linguist Louis Petit de Julleville and produced the first volume of his monumental History, dealing with medieval French. It would eventually stretch to nine volumes published in his lifetime, and 13 volumes altogether. He also published a standard French grammar, and several papers advocating simplified French spelling.

Brunot served as mayor of the 14th arrondissement of Paris in the difficult war years of 1914 through 1919, and served as dean of the University of Paris from 1919 through 1928 while engineering its significant expansion. He was appointed to the Académie des Inscriptions et Belles-Lettres in 1925, later serving as its president, and was awarded the Grand Croix of the Legion of Honor in 1933. He died in Paris.

One of the squares in Paris and one of its fountains, both in his home arrondissement, bear his name.

== Sources ==
- Online biography (in French)
