= Square des Épinettes =

Urban park in Paris, France

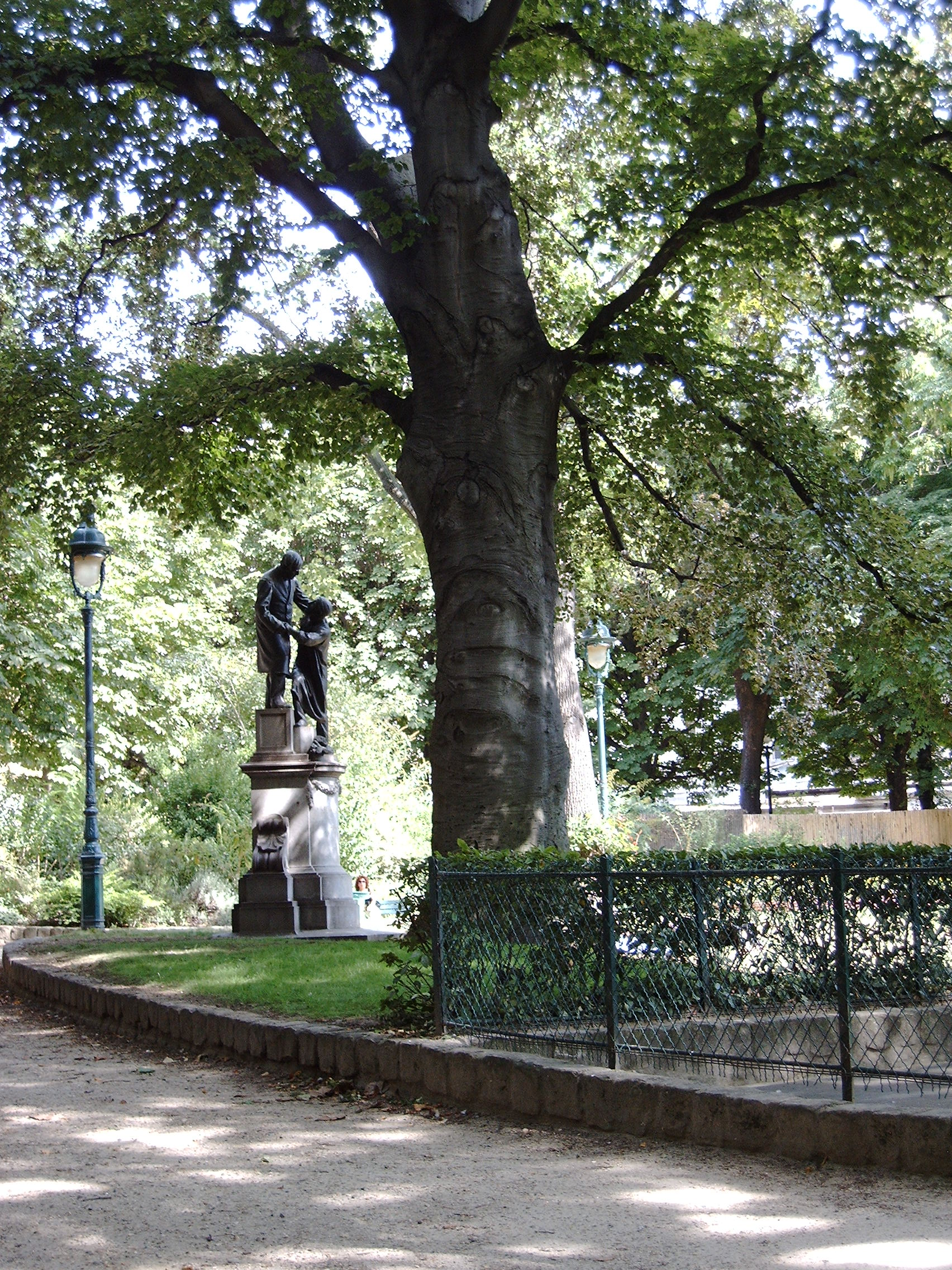
- Jean Leclaire's statue in the Square des Épinettes
- Interactive map of Square des Épinettes
- Type: Urban garden
- Location: 3rd arrondissement, Paris
- Coordinates: 48°53′39.5″N 2°19′35.5″E
- Area: 2.576 acres (1.042 ha)
- Created: 1893
- Status: Open all year
- Public transit: Located near the Métro station Guy Môquet

The Square des Épinettes is a green space in the Épinettes district of Paris (17th arrondissement).

== Location and access ==
The square is bordered by Rue Félix-Pécaut to the north, Rue Maria-Deraismes to the east, Rue Collette to the south and Rue Jean-Leclaire to the west.

The Square des Épinettes is served by line 13 at the Guy Môquet metro station.

== Origin of the name ==
It bears this name in reference to the locality, which has become a district, in which it is located and which owes its name to the white épinette, a grape variety of vines once present on this hill.

== History ==
Created in 1893 by Jean-Camille Formigé, redeveloped in 1980 and 1992, this square covers 10,420^{m2}. A bandstand occupies the centre.

== Remarkable buildings and places of memory ==
The square houses two sculptures:

- the Monument to Jean Leclaire by Jules Dalou (1896);
- the Statue of Maria Deraismes by Louis-Ernest Barrias (1898).

In 1943, these bronzes were taken down by the Vichy regime as part of the mobilization of non-ferrous metals and sent to Germany. The bronze group of the monument to Jean Leclaire was recast and re-erected on its base in 1971, but the bucket held by the worker in the original version is missing.

The statue of Maria Deraismes was recast in 1983 by the Coubertin foundry and re-erected in the square.

== Botany ==
- Horse chestnut, height 35, circumference 383 cm (classified as a remarkable tree).
- Tulip tree, height 17 m, circumference 240 cm (classified as a remarkable tree).
