= Square Louise-Michel =

Urban park in Paris, France

Coordinates: 48.8849°N 2.3434°E

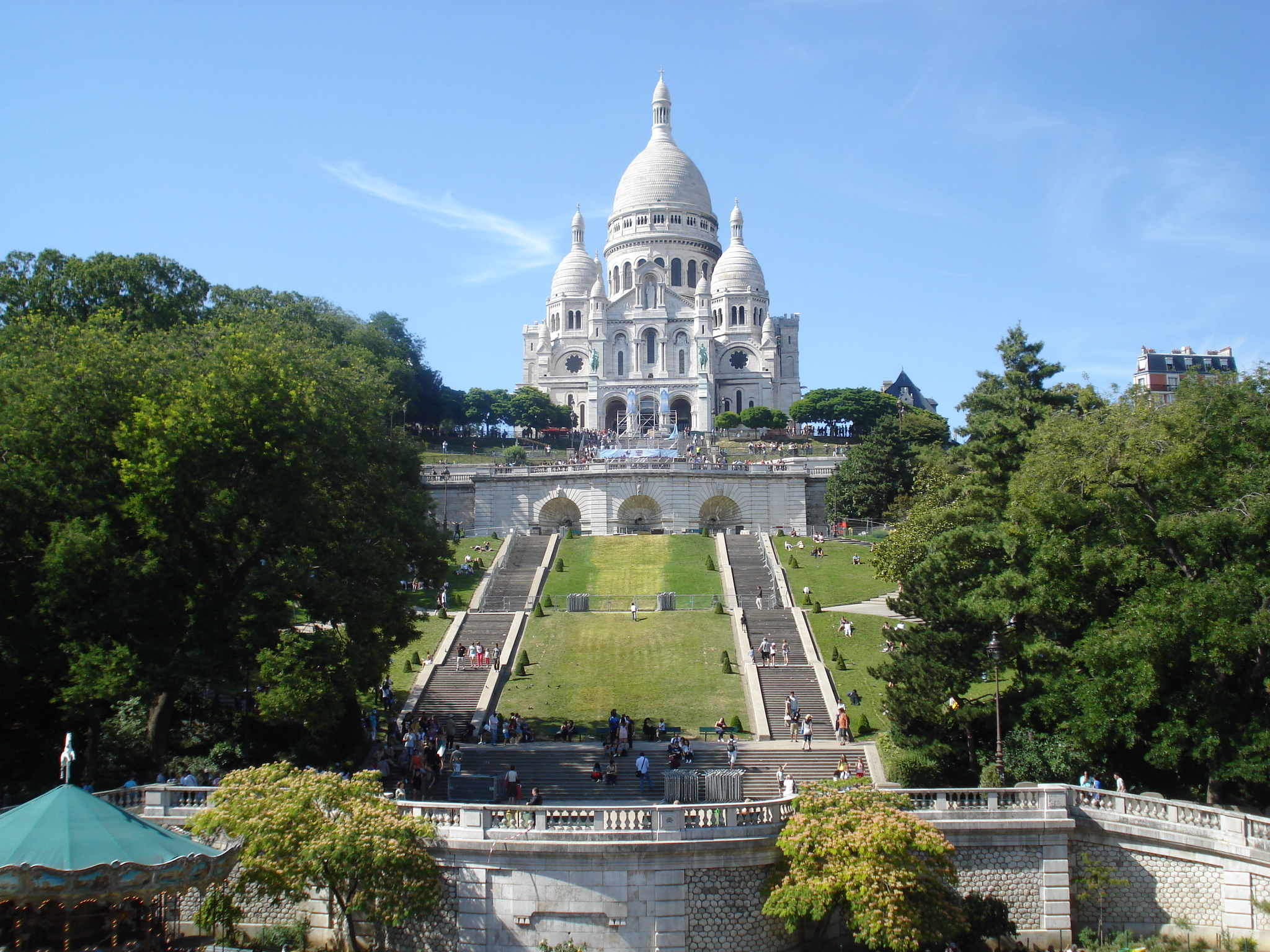
Photo of Square Louise-Michel and the Sacré-Cœur basilica of Montmartre.

The Square Louise-Michel is a square on Montmartre in the 18th arrondissement of Paris, France. It is located in the Quartier des Grandes-Carrières. It is one of the largest green spaces in North Paris and is located next to the Sacré-Cœur. In 2021, it was reported to be the most visited free place in Paris following the 2019 Notre-Dame fire. The park features a carousel.

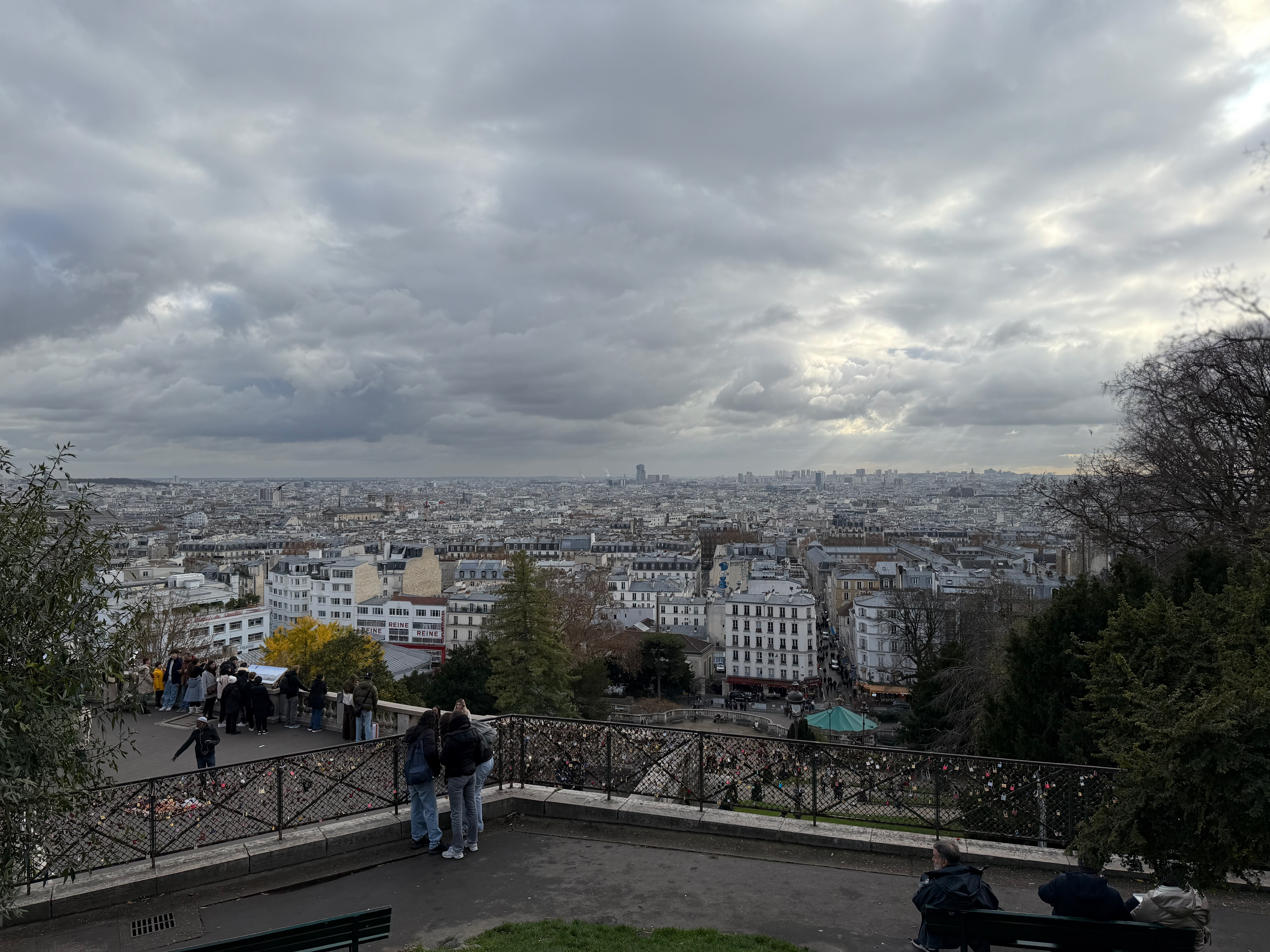
View of Paris from Square Louise Michel in front of Basilique du Sacré-Cœur de Montmartre, facing south on the 9th arr.

== History ==
The square was originally built on the site of a quarry used to extract Gypsum for construction in Paris. The square was first designed in 1880 and built in 1932. Paul Gasq designed a fountain in the park.

=== Renaming ===
In 2004, the square was renamed after French anarchist, feminist and communard Louise Michel to celebrate International Women's Day. In 2021 the Mayor of Paris Anne Hidalgo hosted a ceremony to celebrate the 150th anniversary of the Paris Commune at Square Louise-Michel. The ceremony honored New Caledonia and persecuted communards.

== See also ==
- Feminism in France
- Louise Michel station
