= Cité des Fleurs =

Pedestrian street in Paris, France

Coordinates: 48°53′34″N 2°19′13″E

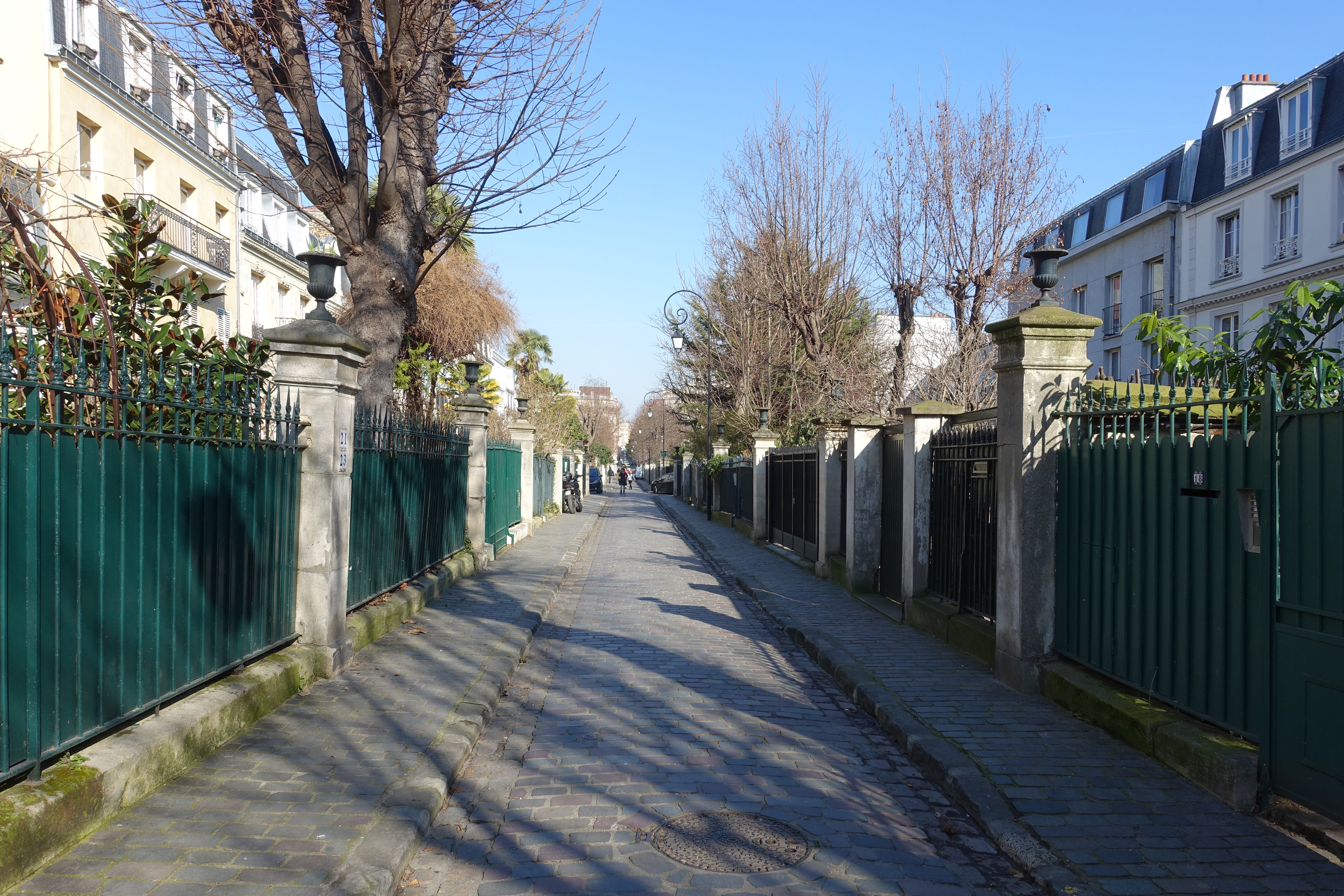
The Cité des Fleurs in winter

The Cité des Fleurs (French pronunciation: [site de flœʁ]) is a pedestrian street in the Épinettes district in the 17th arrondissement of Paris. This small village in the city remained very picturesque with small size buildings and gardens, with each building and plot following strict building guidelines.

The site was created in 1847 by two landowners and is organized around a 320 meters long pedestrian way. Small houses and hôtels particuliers are built on each side of the way.

It was strongly influenced by the industrial neighbourhood: the Goüin family which owned a big industrial company owned a house for its employees. There were also some small factories : Caramels Valentin-Picards or Poupées Gerb's.

During World War II, the house at number 25 hosted a Résistance network. The Gestapo discovered it and most members died, shot in Paris or in camps.

The famous French actresses Catherine Deneuve and Françoise Dorléac were born there in 1943.
