= Paul Gasq =

French sculptor

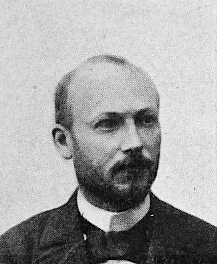
Photo print of Paul Gasq

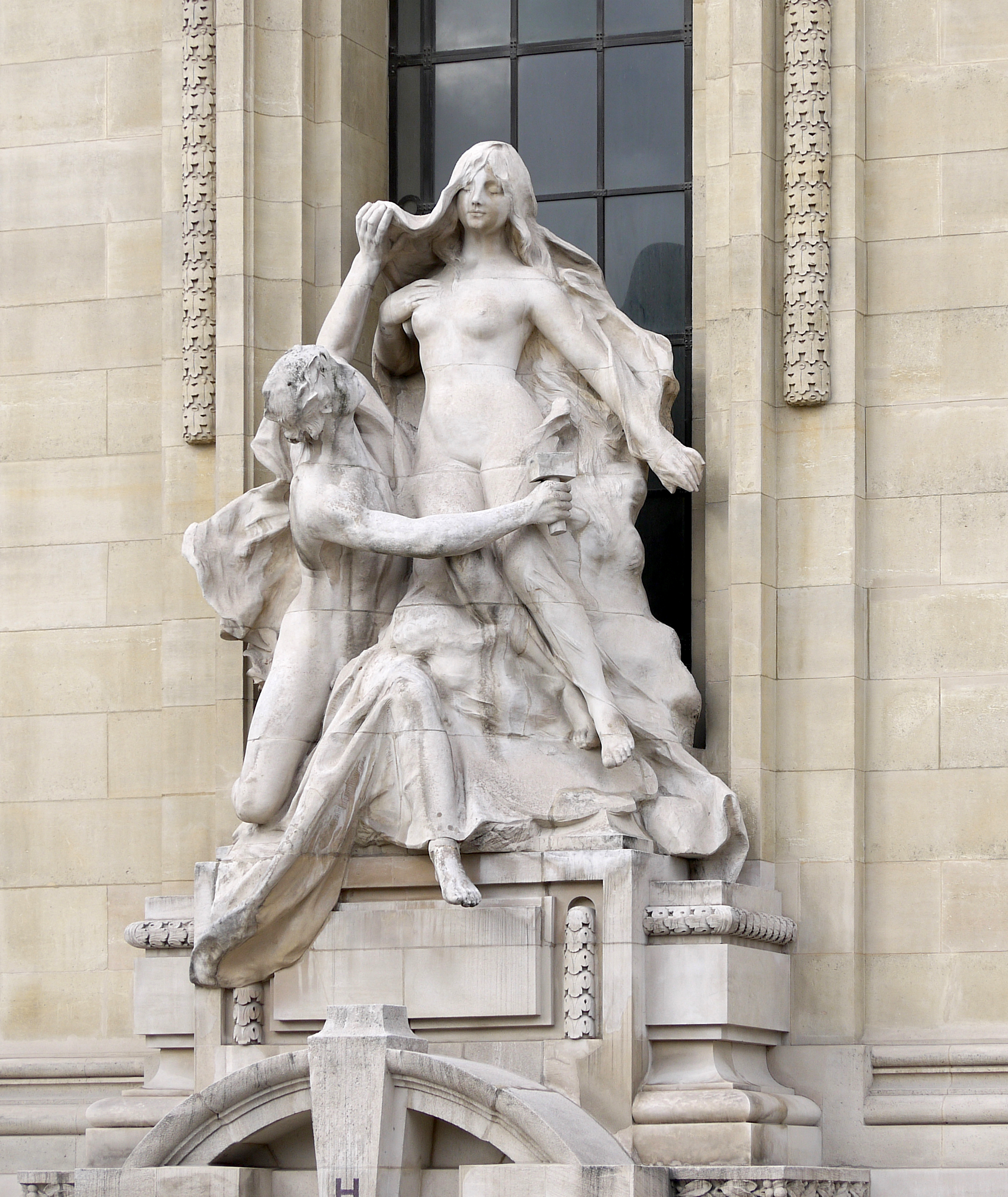
The Artistic Revelation; Grand Palais

Paul Jean-Baptiste Gasq (30 March 1860 – 28 October 1944) was a French sculptor, born in Dijon.

== Life ==
His father was a railway employee who was often absent. He began his studies at the School of Fine Arts in Dijon then, in 1879, enrolled at the École des Beaux-Arts in Paris, where he took the Prix de Rome in 1890 and studied there until 1894. He also won a Grand Prix at the Exposition Universelle (1900).

From 1932, he was the curator of the Dijon Museum. In 1935, he was elected a member of the Académie des Beaux-Arts. He died in Paris

== Work ==
- marble group symbolizing National Education, at the tomb of Eugène Spuller, Père Lachaise Cemetery, Paris, circa 1896
- Medea, Jardin des Tuileries, 1896
- marble and bronze statue of President Marie François Sadi Carnot, Dijon, Place de la Republique, 1899, in collaboration with Mathurin Moreau
- marble group, The Glory of the Generals of the Revolution, at the Pantheon, Paris
- facade allegorical group La Révélation artistique (or Sculpture) at the Grand Palais, Paris, 1900
- Fountaine Subé, (with fellow sculptors Paul Auban and Louis Baralis), Reims, 1906
- architectural bronze Summer and Winter for the Whiteleys department store, Bayswater, London, 1911
- the relief La mobilisation 1914, war memorial in Dijon, 1923
- monumental marine fountain, Square Louise-Michel, Montmartre, Paris, 1932
- L'Electricité on the facade of the Gare de Lyon
