= Edme-Jean Leclaire =

French businessman

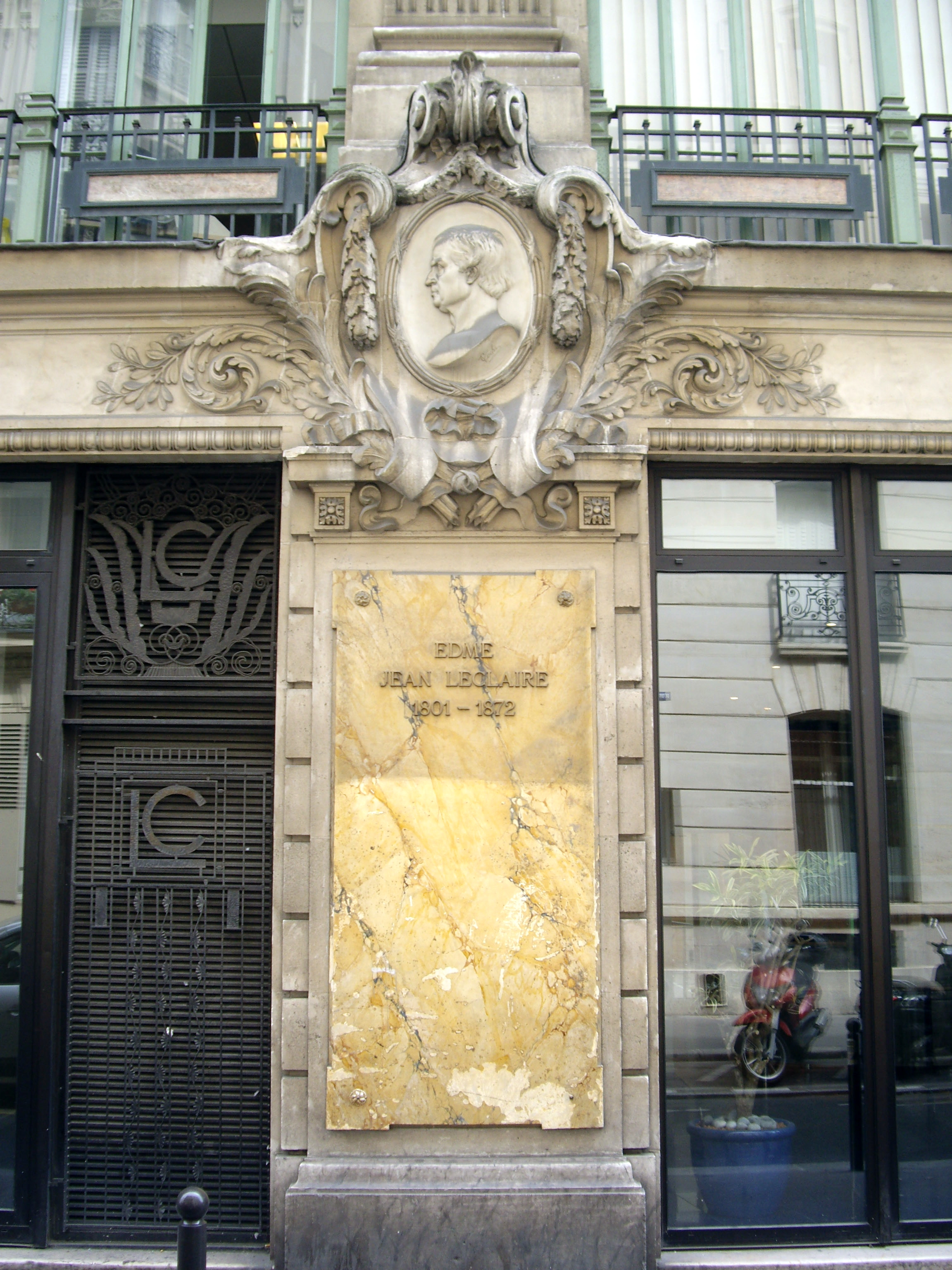
Bust of Edme-Jean Leclaire at the Society of Providence and Mutual Aid of the workers and employees of the Leclaire Company, 25 Rue Bleue, Paris 9th

Edme-Jean Leclaire (14 May 1801 – 13 July 1872) was a French economist and businessman. He developed an early system of employee profit-sharing.

Leclaire was born the son of a poor village shoemaker, in Aisy-sur-Armançon, a small village in the district of Tonnerre, department of Yonne in France. He was a successful contractor glazier-painter, employing from 60 to 80 workers. The Society of Providence and Mutual Aid of the workers and employees of the Leclaire Company, which he founded, was authorized by the French Minister of the Interior on 28 September 1838. Leclaire subsequently served as Mayor of the town of Herblay, a commune in the north-western suburbs of Paris, France.

The short-lived cooperative village of Leclaire in Madison County, Illinois, was founded by N. O. Nelson as a company town for the N. O. Nelson Manufacturing Company. The village was named in honor of Edme-Jean Leclaire. The village, which existed from 1890 to 1934, was operated based on some of Leclaire's principles.
