= Square des Batignolles =

Public park in Paris, France

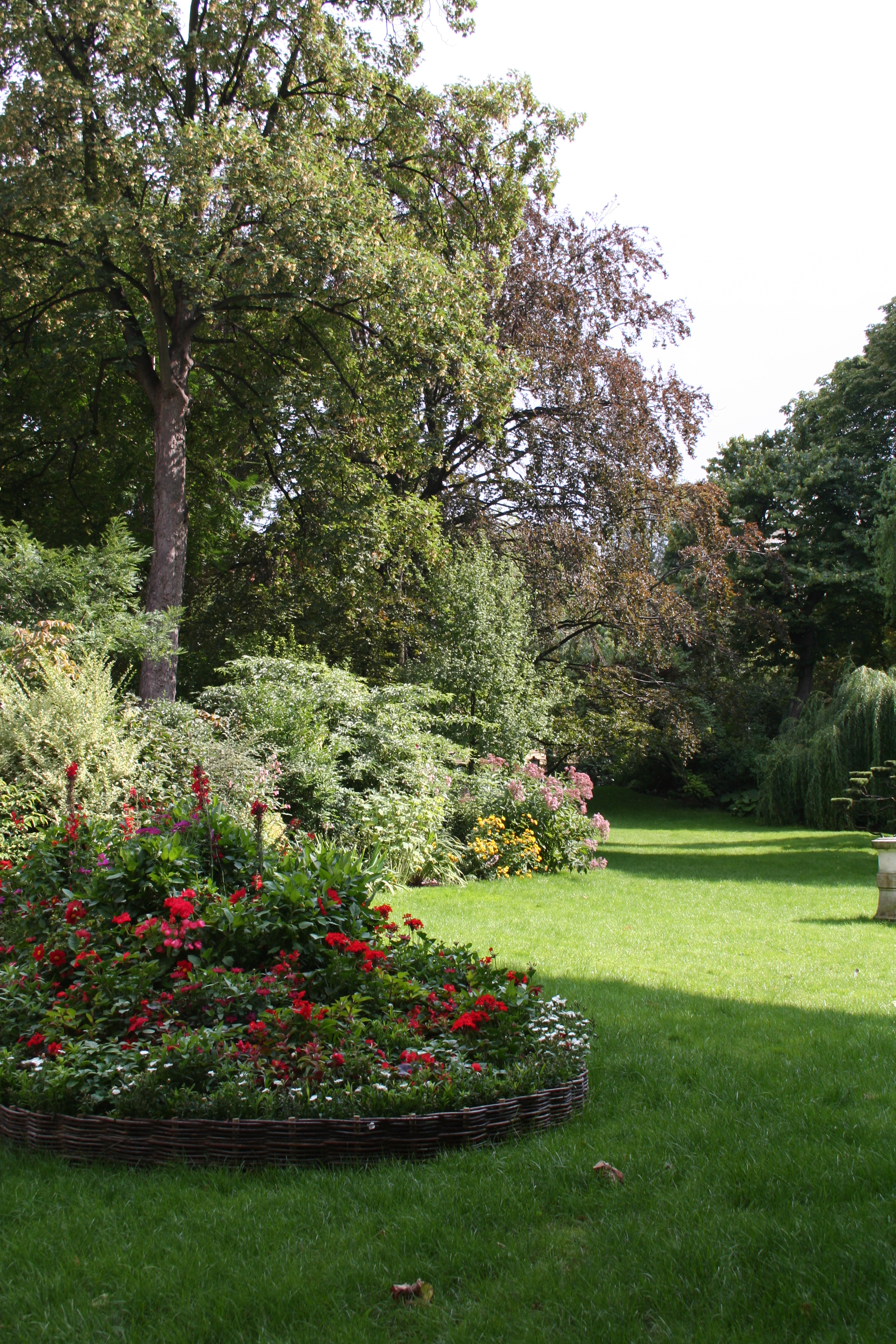
- A typical vista in the Square des Batignolles

- Location within Paris
- Length: 231 m (758 ft)
- Width: 74 m (243 ft)
- Arrondissement: 17th
- Quarter: Batignolles
- Coordinates: 48°53′15″N 2°18′59″E
- From: Rue Cardinet
- To: Rue des Moines

Construction
- Denomination: 7 May 1879

The Square des Batignolles, which covers 16,615 square metres (4 acres) of land, is the largest green space in the 17th arrondissement of Paris. Designed in the naturalistic English-garden style, it lies in the district (quartier) of Batignolles, near the new Parc Clichy-Batignolles.

== The name ==
The origin of the name "Batignolles" may be the Latin word, "batillus", meaning "mill", or, it may be derived from the Provençal word "bastidiole", meaning "small farmhouse".

== History ==
Until the early nineteenth century, the area was largely deserted countryside with a few scattered farms. The square was established under the Second Empire, at the request of Baron Haussmann, who fulfilled the desire of Napoleon III to establish several English-style gardens in the capital. Napoleon III had acquired a taste for the English garden during his exile in England, prior to 1848.

The Square des Batignolles was created by Jean-Charles Adolphe Alphand, assisted by the engineer, Jean Darcel, the architect, Gabriel Davioud, and the horticulturist, Jean-Pierre Barillet-Deschamps, on a tract of land that had been described as "a vast wasteland". This was the same team that had been assembled to design and execute the Bois de Boulogne on the western edge of Paris.

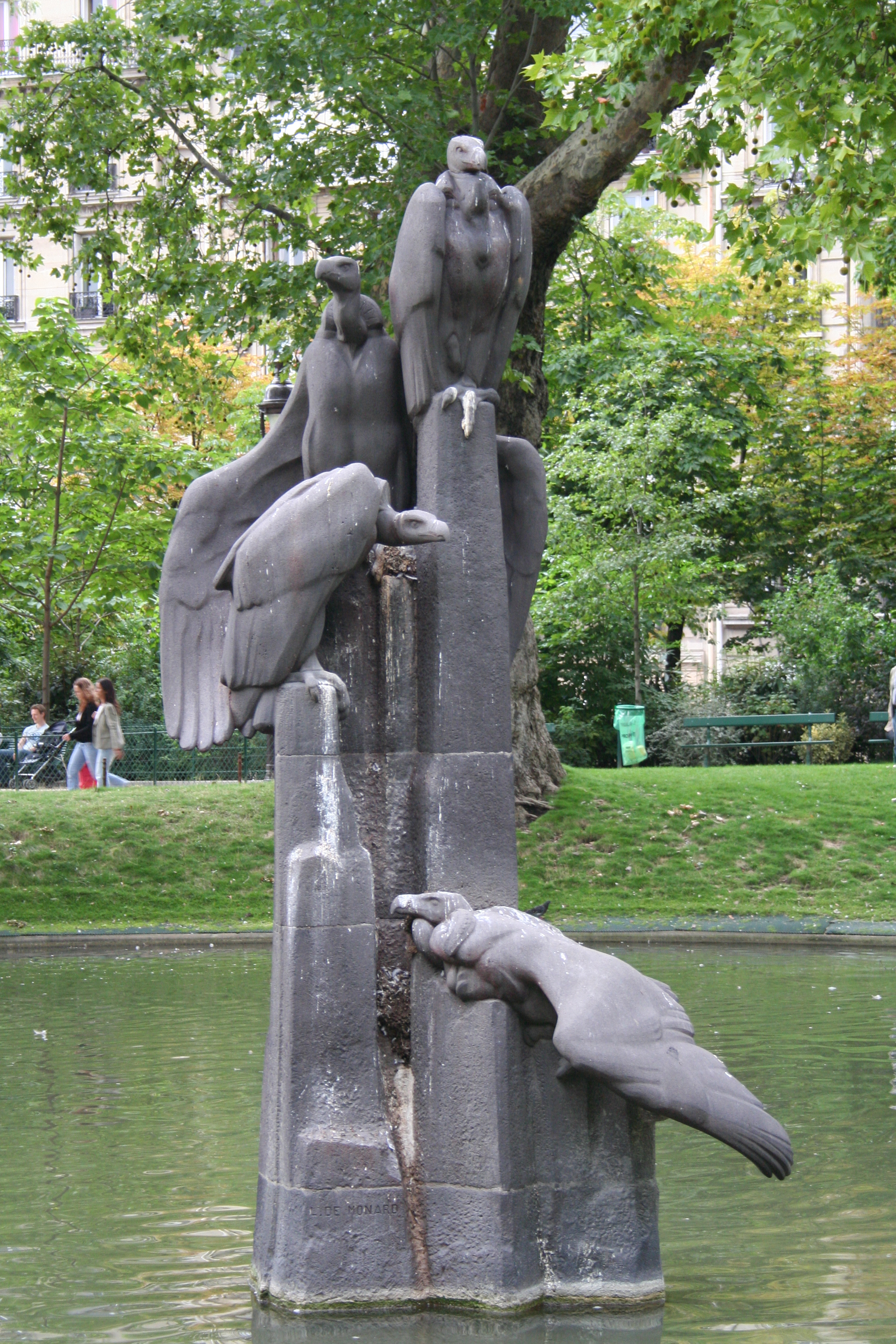
Vulture statue

In 1860, Napoleon III annexed the district of Batignolles to Paris. In 1862, Alphand designed and created the Square des Batignolles. Alphand was the engineer for most of the parks built at this time, including the Parc des Buttes Chaumont, Parc Montsouris, and others.

Currently, the mayor of Paris is trying to maintain the Square des Batignolles in the pure Haussmann-Alphand style. This style is most visible in small bridges, concrete designs with plant motifs, and faux rocks with the appearance of stratification (as at Parc des Buttes-Chaumont).

== Description ==
The Square des Batignolles was designed as an English garden (or landscape garden), a style first made popular by the English landscape architect, Capability Brown.

=== The English landscape garden ===
The key to this style is naturalism, a studied, but unselfconscious, attempt to leave the impression that the grounds are untouched by human hands. The landscaper employs his artistry, through the use of various forms of asymmetric balance, to convince the visitor that the apparent wildness and randomness of the terrain is the product of artful Nature, rather than the artifice of Man. In contrast to previous formal gardens, with their geometrically designed parterres and pathways, their severely clipped shrubbery, and the artificiality of their topiary, which reflect an attempt to impose the gardener's will on Nature, the English garden adopts a more cooperative or collaborative approach. The English gardener and landscape architect, Capability Brown, compared his role as a garden designer to that of a poet or composer: "Here I put a comma, there, when it's necessary to cut the view, I put a parenthesis; there I end it with a period and start on another theme.".

The English-garden style also relies heavily on symbolism by using objects that are clearly man-made (called architectural follies) as focal points for gazing at the overall landscape. These human touches usually take the form of sham ruins; this is to demonstrate the impermanence of man's achievements in comparison to those of Nature. Other man-made features typically used in these gardens are temples, tea-houses, belvederes, pavilions, and gazebos whose placement invites the visitor to engage the landscape from the most aesthetically pleasing vantage points. These locative devices are usually supplemented by vast rolling lawns, well-placed copses of trees, quaint stone bridges, pieces of statuary casually installed in the landscape, grottos, strategically located ponds and watercourses, small waterfalls, and artificial cascades. Exotic vegetation was also planted, both to amaze the senses but also to display the power and reach of the Second Empire, which was capable of gathering and nurturing living species from all over the world.

True to the archetype, the Square des Batignolles features extensive rolling lawns and a large pond that is fed by a natural stream that courses through the park. The pond is home to large red Japanese carp, known as koi, and over three hundred ducks of various species. In the middle of the pond stands a statue created by Louis de Monard in 1930 called Vautours (Vultures). Elsewhere in the Square is a bust of the poet, Léon Dierx (1838–1912), created by Bony de Lavergne in 1932.

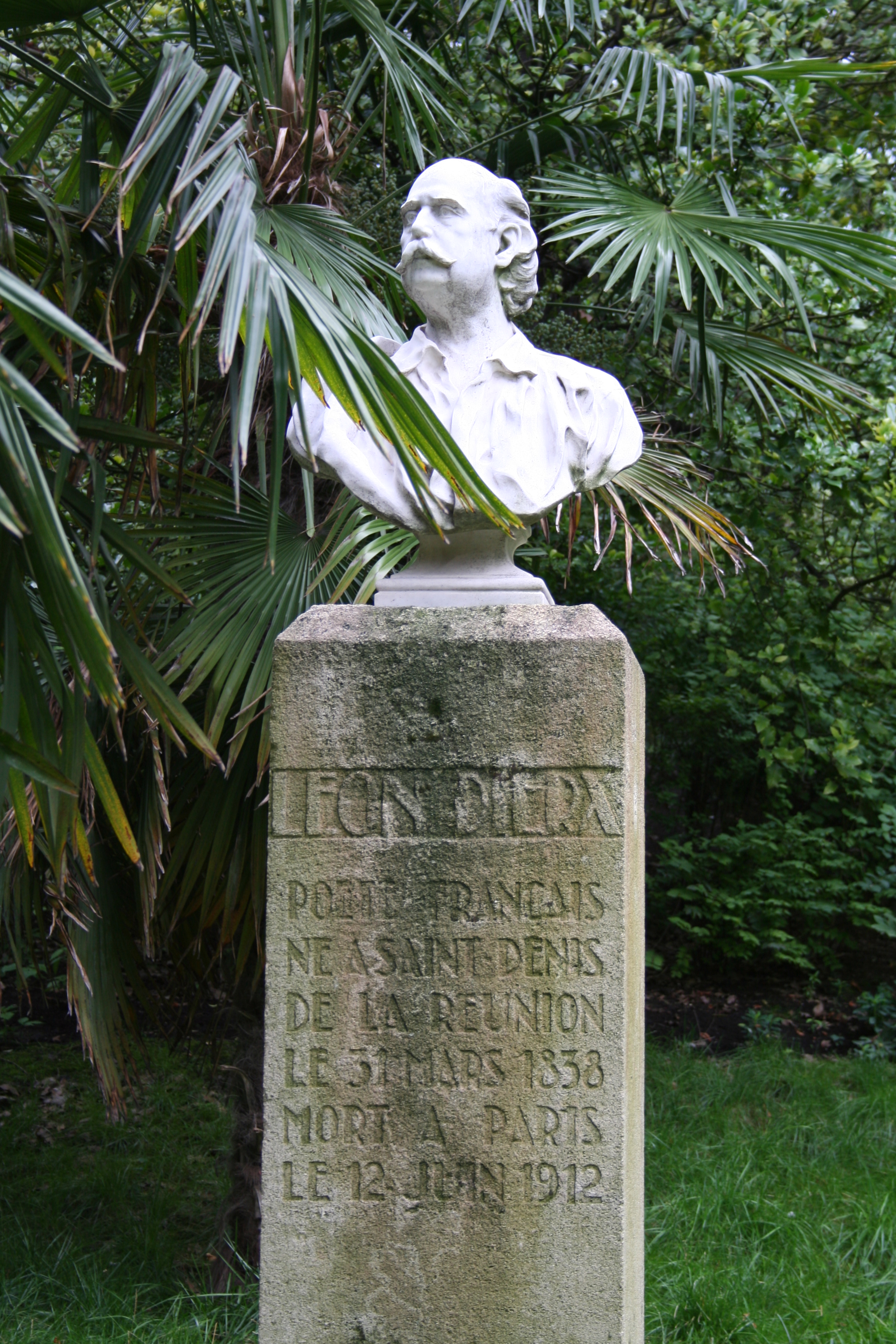
Léon Dierx

=== Vegetation ===
For a park such a small area (less than two hectares), there is a large lawn, and the many wandering paths are shaded by a variety of trees. There are oriental plane trees that are over 140 years old and over thirty meters in height. There is a relatively young giant sequoia, which has yet to become gigantic. There are hazelnut trees from Asia Minor, Siberian elms, Japanese cherry trees, ash trees, willows, black walnuts, and others. On top of a small rocky outcrop is a glass-walled gazebo which acts as a greenhouse for a solitary tropical palm tree.

The following tree specimens can be found in the square :

- four hybrid trees (Platanus x Hispanica), planted in 1840 and 1880, all between 32 and 38 metres high, one of which is 5.90 m in circumference and among the largest in Paris
- the purple beech (Fagus sylvatica, Fagus purpurea), one example of which is now gigantic
- the honey locust (Gleditsia triacanthos), native to North America
- the Chinese 'corkscrew' willow (Salix matsudana 'Tortuosa')
- the Turkish hazel (Corylus colurna)
- ash trees with aucuba-like leaves (Fraxinus aucubaefolia)
- the Japanese persimmon (Diospyros kaki)
- the trifolia lemon (Citrus limon)
- a giant sequoia (Sequoiadendron giganteum)

Square des Batignolles is popular with children. There are several playgrounds, sand-boxes, swings, a carousel with old-fashioned wooden horses, an area for roller skating, and ping-pong tables. There are also areas for adults who wish to play pétanque, or boules.

== Public transportation ==
The Square des Batignolles is served by:

- Pont Cardinet station on Line 14 of the Paris Métro
- Pont Cardinet station on Lines 28, 31 and 163, Pont Cardinet - Batignolles station on Line 66 and Line La Traverse Batignolles - Bichat, and Square des Batignolles station on Line 66 of the RATP bus network
- Pont Cardinet station on Line L of the SNCF's Transillien network.

== References in popular culture ==
Monique Andrée Serf, whose stage name was "Barbara", was a French singer and songwriter who was born in Paris on 9 June 1930 and died in Neuilly-sur-Seine on 24 November 1997. Her lyricism and depth of emotion earned her an audience that followed her avidly for forty years. Square des Batignolles was mentioned by Barbara in her song "Perlimpinpin":

The taste of water, the taste of bread
And the Perlimpinpin
In the Square des Batignolles!

Yves Duteil titled one of his songs, "Les Batignolles" (1976) :

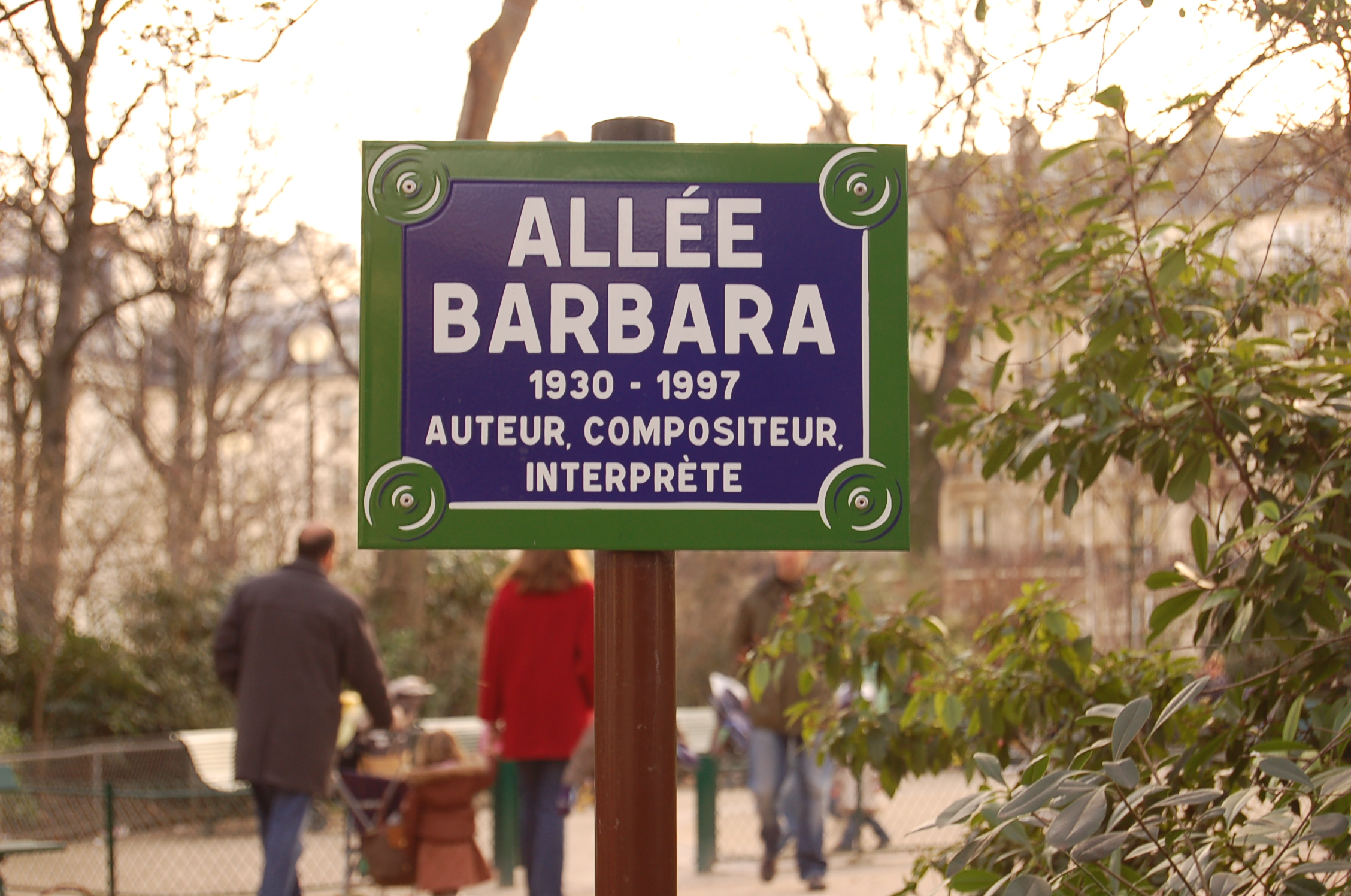
Pathway named for the singer-songwriter, Barbara

So, in the Square des Batignolles
I forded the river to see the pigeons flying.
We were running to catch them ....
On the deck, watching the clouds,
We inhaled the crazy smell
That emerged from passing steam locomotives
And, at the heart of the white smoke,
Everything else disappeared ... .

He refers here to the trains running between the Gare Saint-Lazare and the Gare de Pont-Cardinet stations nearby.
