= Victor Bohain =

French journalist and businessman (1804–1856)

Alexandre-Victor-Philippe Bohain (1 March 1804 – 19 July 1856) was a 19th-century French journalist, businessman and civil servant.

== Biography ==
Born in Paris, he was first editor at L'Europe littéraire. In 1827, he acquired from Auguste Le Poitevin de L'Égreville, le Figaro for 30,000 francs, of which he was editor-in-chief with Nestor Roqueplan.

His wealth was then estimated at more than 4 million francs. Jules Bertaut, Les Dessous de la finance, Paris, Tallandier, 1954 (pp. 136–138). He was known in the financial world as the "lame guy".

As an entrepreneur, he founded Le Courrier de l' Europe, then the "Brasserie anglaise et hollandaise" on the Champs-Élysées, the first establishment of its kind; he was also a theatre director and playwright. He put together a play, Les Immortels, written in collaboration with editors of Le Figaro. Another play that was immediately suppressed by the royal censorship was Mirabeau, which was performed by Frédérick Lemaître.

With the advent of Louis-Philippe I in 1830, he was appointed prefect of the Charente department. On 24 October 1834, he fought in a duel with Jean-Gabriel Capot de Feuillide. In 1835, he joined the Société des éditeurs unis, with Jean-Baptiste-Alexandre Paulin and Émile de Girardin. The latter was prosecuted for financial malpractice because of Bohain. In 1840, Bohain went into exile in London.

Back in France, he founded L'Époque with Félix Solar in 1845 and La Semaine in 1846. Then he started publishing a dictionary under the direction of Napoléon Landais. He was soon ruined and lived in an obscure house in the Batignolles where he died. His widow refused to accept the inheritance.
