= Climate of Paris =

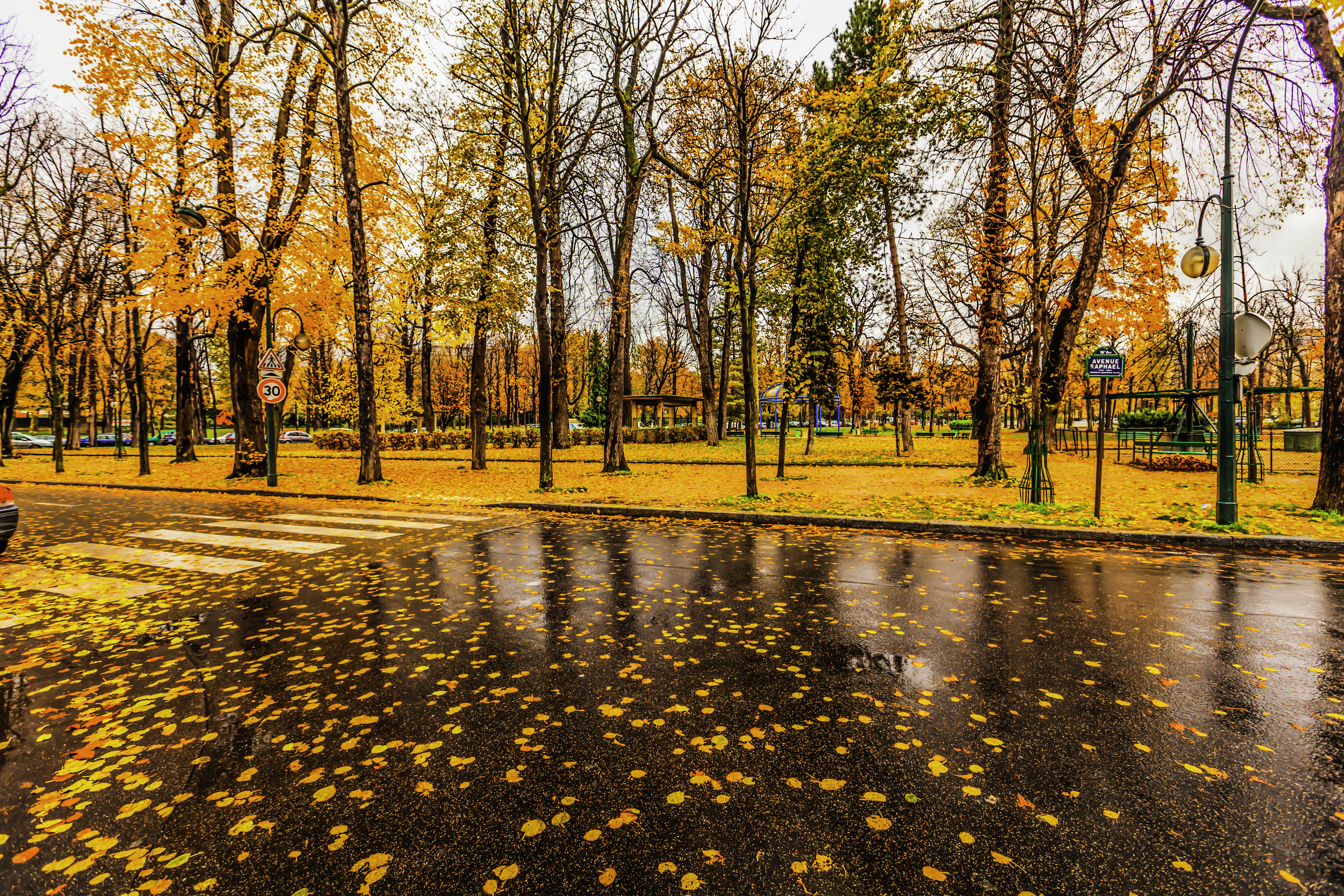
Autumn in Paris

Paris has a typical oceanic climate (Köppen climate classification: Cfb), affected by the North Atlantic Current. The overall climate throughout the year is mild and moderately wet. Summer days are usually warm and pleasant with average temperatures between 15 and 25 °C (59 and 77 °F), and a fair amount of sunshine. Each year, however, there are a few days when the temperature rises above 32 °C (90 °F). Longer periods of more intense heat sometimes occur, such as the heat wave of 2003 when temperatures exceeded 30 °C (86 °F) for weeks, reached 40 °C (104 °F) on some days and seldom cooled down at night. Spring and autumn have, on average, mild days and cool nights but are changing and unstable. Surprisingly warm or cool weather occurs frequently in both seasons. In winter, sunshine is scarce; days are cool, nights cold but generally above freezing with low temperatures around 3 °C (37 °F). Light night frosts are however quite common, but the temperature will rarely dip below −5 °C (23 °F) and not every year. Snow falls every year, but rarely stays on the ground. The city sometimes sees light snow or flurries with or without accumulation. However, heat generated by buildings and traffic in the city also contributes to the disappearance of snow in the city center. The most likely time of the snowfall is between December and March. But it does not snow significantly for so many days. Paris has an average annual precipitation of 64.1 cm (25.2 in), and experiences light rainfall distributed evenly throughout the year. However the city is known for intermittent abrupt heavy showers.

Paris has a rich history of meteorological observations, with some going back as far as 1665. The highest recorded temperature is 42.6 °C (108.7 °F) on 25 July 2019, and the lowest is −23.9 °C (−11.0 °F) on 10 December 1879. Furthermore, the warmest night on record is 27.5 °C (81.5 °F) on 27 June 1772 and the coldest day is −13.0 °C (8.6 °F) on 30 December 1788.

Climate data for Paris (Parc Montsouris), elevation: 75 m (246 ft), 1991–2020 normals, extremes 1872–present
Month	Jan	Feb	Mar	Apr	May	Jun	Jul	Aug	Sep	Oct	Nov	Dec	Year
Record high °C (°F)	16.1 (61.0)	21.4 (70.5)	26.0 (78.8)	30.2 (86.4)	34.8 (94.6)	40.3 (104.5)	42.6 (108.7)	39.5 (103.1)	36.2 (97.2)	28.9 (84.0)	21.6 (70.9)	17.1 (62.8)	42.6 (108.7)
Mean daily maximum °C (°F)	7.6 (45.7)	8.8 (47.8)	12.8 (55.0)	16.6 (61.9)	20.2 (68.4)	23.4 (74.1)	25.7 (78.3)	25.6 (78.1)	21.5 (70.7)	16.5 (61.7)	11.1 (52.0)	8.0 (46.4)	16.5 (61.7)
Daily mean °C (°F)	5.4 (41.7)	6.0 (42.8)	9.2 (48.6)	12.2 (54.0)	15.6 (60.1)	18.8 (65.8)	20.9 (69.6)	20.8 (69.4)	17.2 (63.0)	13.2 (55.8)	8.7 (47.7)	5.9 (42.6)	12.8 (55.0)
Mean daily minimum °C (°F)	3.2 (37.8)	3.3 (37.9)	5.6 (42.1)	7.9 (46.2)	11.1 (52.0)	14.2 (57.6)	16.2 (61.2)	16.0 (60.8)	13.0 (55.4)	9.9 (49.8)	6.2 (43.2)	3.8 (38.8)	9.2 (48.6)
Record low °C (°F)	−14.6 (5.7)	−14.7 (5.5)	−9.1 (15.6)	−3.5 (25.7)	−0.1 (31.8)	3.1 (37.6)	6.0 (42.8)	6.3 (43.3)	1.8 (35.2)	−3.8 (25.2)	−14.0 (6.8)	−23.9 (−11.0)	−23.9 (−11.0)
Average precipitation mm (inches)	47.6 (1.87)	41.8 (1.65)	45.2 (1.78)	45.8 (1.80)	69.0 (2.72)	51.3 (2.02)	59.4 (2.34)	58.0 (2.28)	44.7 (1.76)	55.2 (2.17)	54.3 (2.14)	62.0 (2.44)	634.3 (24.97)
Average precipitation days (≥ 1.0 mm)	9.9	9.1	9.5	8.6	9.2	8.3	7.4	8.1	7.5	9.5	10.4	11.4	108.9
Average snowy days	3.0	3.9	1.6	0.6	0.0	0.0	0.0	0.0	0.0	0.0	0.7	2.1	11.9
Average relative humidity (%)	83	78	73	69	70	69	68	71	76	82	84	84	76
Mean monthly sunshine hours	59.0	83.7	134.9	177.3	201.0	203.5	222.4	215.3	174.7	118.6	69.8	56.9	1,717
Percentage possible sunshine	22	29	37	43	43	42	46	48	46	35	25	22	37
Average ultraviolet index	1	2	3	4	6	7	7	6	4	3	1	1	4
Source 1: Meteo France (snow days 1981–2010), Infoclimat.fr (relative humidity 1961–1990)
Source 2: Weather Atlas (percent sunshine and UV Index)

Climate data for Paris (Jardin du Luxembourg, 1991-2020 normals, elevation: 46m, extremes 1978-present
Month	Jan	Feb	Mar	Apr	May	Jun	Jul	Aug	Sep	Oct	Nov	Dec	Year
Record high °C (°F)	17.5 (63.5)	22.9 (73.2)	27.3 (81.1)	31.5 (88.7)	36.0 (96.8)	42.2 (108.0)	41.9 (107.4)	40.2 (104.4)	35.7 (96.3)	30.7 (87.3)	22.5 (72.5)	17.5 (63.5)	42.2 (108.0)
Mean daily maximum °C (°F)	8.2 (46.8)	9.7 (49.5)	13.7 (56.7)	17.5 (63.5)	21.0 (69.8)	24.1 (75.4)	26.5 (79.7)	26.5 (79.7)	22.7 (72.9)	17.5 (63.5)	11.8 (53.2)	8.5 (47.3)	17.3 (63.2)
Daily mean °C (°F)	5.8 (42.4)	6.6 (43.9)	9.6 (49.3)	12.7 (54.9)	16.0 (60.8)	19.1 (66.4)	21.3 (70.3)	21.2 (70.2)	17.7 (63.9)	13.7 (56.7)	9.1 (48.4)	6.2 (43.2)	13.2 (55.9)
Mean daily minimum °C (°F)	3.4 (38.1)	3.5 (38.3)	5.6 (42.1)	7.8 (46.0)	11.0 (51.8)	14.1 (57.4)	16.0 (60.8)	15.8 (60.4)	12.7 (54.9)	9.9 (49.8)	6.4 (43.5)	4.0 (39.2)	9.2 (48.5)
Record low °C (°F)	−13.8 (7.2)	−11.6 (11.1)	−6.2 (20.8)	−2.0 (28.4)	2.3 (36.1)	6.1 (43.0)	8.7 (47.7)	8.6 (47.5)	5.0 (41.0)	−1.0 (30.2)	−6.3 (20.7)	−8.0 (17.6)	−13.8 (7.2)
Average precipitation mm (inches)	51 (2.0)	45 (1.8)	46 (1.8)	49 (1.9)	75 (3.0)	54 (2.1)	57 (2.2)	59 (2.3)	49 (1.9)	57 (2.2)	58 (2.3)	67 (2.6)	667 (26.3)
Average precipitation days (≥ 1.0 mm)	10.9	9.6	9.5	8.6	9.4	8.5	7.1	8.1	7.7	9.9	10.8	11.7	111.7
Source: Meteociel

Climate data for Paris (Orly Airport), 1991–2020 normals, elevation: 89 m, extremes 1921–present
Month	Jan	Feb	Mar	Apr	May	Jun	Jul	Aug	Sep	Oct	Nov	Dec	Year
Record high °C (°F)	16.5 (61.7)	20.8 (69.4)	25.3 (77.5)	29.4 (84.9)	35.0 (95.0)	37.1 (98.8)	41.9 (107.4)	40.0 (104.0)	35.4 (95.7)	31.3 (88.3)	21.8 (71.2)	17.3 (63.1)	41.9 (107.4)
Mean daily maximum °C (°F)	7.2 (45.0)	8.5 (47.3)	12.5 (54.5)	16.2 (61.2)	19.8 (67.6)	23.2 (73.8)	25.8 (78.4)	25.7 (78.3)	21.5 (70.7)	16.4 (61.5)	10.9 (51.6)	7.6 (45.7)	16.3 (61.3)
Daily mean °C (°F)	4.7 (40.5)	5.2 (41.4)	8.3 (46.9)	11.3 (52.3)	14.8 (58.6)	18.2 (64.8)	20.4 (68.7)	20.2 (68.4)	16.5 (61.7)	12.6 (54.7)	7.9 (46.2)	5.2 (41.4)	12.1 (53.8)
Mean daily minimum °C (°F)	2.1 (35.8)	2.0 (35.6)	4.2 (39.6)	6.4 (43.5)	9.9 (49.8)	13.1 (55.6)	15.0 (59.0)	14.6 (58.3)	11.5 (52.7)	8.7 (47.7)	5.0 (41.0)	2.7 (36.9)	7.9 (46.2)
Record low °C (°F)	−16.8 (1.8)	−15.0 (5.0)	−9.4 (15.1)	−4.3 (24.3)	−1.3 (29.7)	3.1 (37.6)	6.7 (44.1)	5.6 (42.1)	1.7 (35.1)	−3.9 (25.0)	−9.6 (14.7)	−13.3 (8.1)	−16.8 (1.8)
Average precipitation mm (inches)	46.8 (1.84)	42.6 (1.68)	44.4 (1.75)	44.5 (1.75)	63.0 (2.48)	56.1 (2.21)	52.9 (2.08)	57.9 (2.28)	47.4 (1.87)	52.8 (2.08)	53.4 (2.10)	60.4 (2.38)	622.2 (24.50)
Average precipitation days (≥ 1.0 mm)	10.5	9.0	8.9	8.6	9.5	8.4	7.0	7.7	7.7	9.3	10.3	11.6	108.6
Average snowy days	3.6	4.3	2.0	0.4	0.0	0.0	0.0	0.0	0.0	0.1	0.6	2.3	13.2
Average relative humidity (%)	86	80	76	76	72	71	70	71	77	83	86	86	77.5
Source 1: Meteo France
Source 2: Infoclimat.fr (humidity 1961–1990)

Climate data for Paris (Le Bourget Airport), elevation: 65 m, 1961-1990 normals and extremes
Month	Jan	Feb	Mar	Apr	May	Jun	Jul	Aug	Sep	Oct	Nov	Dec	Year
Record high °C (°F)	15.6 (60.1)	19.9 (67.8)	23.6 (74.5)	27.0 (80.6)	30.9 (87.6)	35.0 (95.0)	36.9 (98.4)	37.3 (99.1)	33.1 (91.6)	28.6 (83.5)	20.0 (68.0)	17.2 (63.0)	37.3 (99.1)
Mean daily maximum °C (°F)	6.5 (43.7)	7.6 (45.7)	10.6 (51.1)	14.2 (57.6)	17.9 (64.2)	21.4 (70.5)	23.6 (74.5)	23.4 (74.1)	20.9 (69.6)	16.4 (61.5)	10.0 (50.0)	7.0 (44.6)	15.0 (58.9)
Daily mean °C (°F)	3.8 (38.8)	4.6 (40.3)	6.9 (44.4)	9.7 (49.5)	13.1 (55.6)	16.2 (61.2)	18.3 (64.9)	18.1 (64.6)	15.7 (60.3)	11.9 (53.4)	6.9 (44.4)	4.6 (40.3)	10.8 (51.5)
Mean daily minimum °C (°F)	1.3 (34.3)	1.5 (34.7)	3.1 (37.6)	5.0 (41.0)	8.3 (46.9)	11.2 (52.2)	12.5 (54.5)	12.7 (54.9)	11.0 (51.8)	7.7 (45.9)	3.7 (38.7)	1.9 (35.4)	6.7 (44.0)
Record low °C (°F)	−18.2 (−0.8)	−13.6 (7.5)	−9.6 (14.7)	−3.2 (26.2)	−0.9 (30.4)	2.8 (37.0)	4.5 (40.1)	4.7 (40.5)	1.5 (34.7)	−5.6 (21.9)	−7.8 (18.0)	−13.5 (7.7)	−18.2 (−0.8)
Average precipitation mm (inches)	56.4 (2.22)	43.2 (1.70)	52.3 (2.06)	44.5 (1.75)	66.6 (2.62)	60.9 (2.40)	49.2 (1.94)	45.8 (1.80)	44.0 (1.73)	49.5 (1.95)	55.9 (2.20)	49.2 (1.94)	617.5 (24.31)
Average precipitation days (≥ 1.0 mm)	10.0	10.0	11.0	9.0	10.5	9.0	7.5	8.0	8.0	9.0	10.0	10.0	112
Average snowy days	3.5	2.5	2.5	0	0	0	0	0	0	0	0	2.0	10.5
Mean monthly sunshine hours	55.6	87.5	129.4	172.8	201.4	218.8	239.1	221.1	172.3	125.9	75.2	50.6	1,749.7
Percentage possible sunshine	21.0	31.0	36.0	42.0	43.0	46.0	46.0	46.0	46.0	38.0	28.0	20.0	36.9
Source: NOAA

Climate data for Paris (Château de Bagatelle, 16th arrondissement of Paris) (elevation: 36 m, 1981–2010 averages, extremes 1988−2014)
Month	Jan	Feb	Mar	Apr	May	Jun	Jul	Aug	Sep	Oct	Nov	Dec	Year
Record high °C (°F)	16.5 (61.7)	22.0 (71.6)	26.0 (78.8)	31.0 (87.8)	33.0 (91.4)	38.0 (100.4)	38.5 (101.3)	40.5 (104.9)	34.5 (94.1)	33.0 (91.4)	23.5 (74.3)	17.7 (63.9)	40.5 (104.9)
Mean daily maximum °C (°F)	8.1 (46.6)	9.6 (49.3)	13.5 (56.3)	16.8 (62.2)	21.3 (70.3)	24.1 (75.4)	26.4 (79.5)	26.4 (79.5)	22.1 (71.8)	17.1 (62.8)	11.2 (52.2)	7.8 (46.0)	17.1 (62.8)
Daily mean °C (°F)	5.4 (41.7)	6.1 (43.0)	9.1 (48.4)	11.6 (52.9)	15.8 (60.4)	18.5 (65.3)	20.6 (69.1)	20.6 (69.1)	16.8 (62.2)	12.9 (55.2)	8.1 (46.6)	5.3 (41.5)	12.6 (54.7)
Mean daily minimum °C (°F)	2.7 (36.9)	2.6 (36.7)	4.7 (40.5)	6.3 (43.3)	10.3 (50.5)	12.9 (55.2)	14.9 (58.8)	14.7 (58.5)	11.5 (52.7)	8.7 (47.7)	5.0 (41.0)	2.8 (37.0)	8.1 (46.6)
Record low °C (°F)	−12.0 (10.4)	−13.0 (8.6)	−8.0 (17.6)	−2.0 (28.4)	1.5 (34.7)	4.0 (39.2)	7.0 (44.6)	6.5 (43.7)	4.0 (39.2)	−2.5 (27.5)	−8.0 (17.6)	−10.0 (14.0)	−13.0 (8.6)
Average precipitation mm (inches)	52.9 (2.08)	43.3 (1.70)	48.0 (1.89)	49.4 (1.94)	64.1 (2.52)	53.2 (2.09)	58.9 (2.32)	51.0 (2.01)	48.1 (1.89)	60.8 (2.39)	51.9 (2.04)	58.4 (2.30)	640.0 (25.20)
Average precipitation days (≥ 1.0 mm)	10.6	9.3	10.6	9.5	10.0	8.7	8.2	7.3	7.8	10.0	10.5	11.6	114.1
Source: Meteociel

Climate data for Paris (Batignolles, 17th arrondissement of Paris) (elevation: 45 m, 1981–2010 averages, extremes 1990−2015)
Month	Jan	Feb	Mar	Apr	May	Jun	Jul	Aug	Sep	Oct	Nov	Dec	Year
Record high °C (°F)	16.5 (61.7)	18.5 (65.3)	25.0 (77.0)	28.5 (83.3)	31.0 (87.8)	37.5 (99.5)	37.5 (99.5)	39.0 (102.2)	32.0 (89.6)	29.0 (84.2)	20.5 (68.9)	16.5 (61.7)	39.0 (102.2)
Mean daily maximum °C (°F)	7.7 (45.9)	9.0 (48.2)	12.9 (55.2)	16.4 (61.5)	20.3 (68.5)	23.4 (74.1)	25.7 (78.3)	25.7 (78.3)	21.7 (71.1)	16.8 (62.2)	11.2 (52.2)	7.7 (45.9)	16.6 (61.9)
Daily mean °C (°F)	5.5 (41.9)	6.3 (43.3)	9.5 (49.1)	12.3 (54.1)	15.9 (60.6)	18.8 (65.8)	21.0 (69.8)	21.1 (70.0)	17.4 (63.3)	13.7 (56.7)	8.9 (48.0)	5.7 (42.3)	13.0 (55.4)
Mean daily minimum °C (°F)	3.4 (38.1)	3.7 (38.7)	6.1 (43.0)	8.2 (46.8)	11.6 (52.9)	14.3 (57.7)	16.4 (61.5)	16.6 (61.9)	13.3 (55.9)	10.4 (50.7)	6.6 (43.9)	3.7 (38.7)	9.6 (49.3)
Record low °C (°F)	−12.0 (10.4)	−11.0 (12.2)	−4.0 (24.8)	−1.5 (29.3)	3.5 (38.3)	6.0 (42.8)	10.0 (50.0)	10.0 (50.0)	5.0 (41.0)	0.5 (32.9)	−5.5 (22.1)	−8.5 (16.7)	−12.0 (10.4)
Average precipitation mm (inches)	47.4 (1.87)	40.5 (1.59)	44.3 (1.74)	48.5 (1.91)	65.5 (2.58)	50.0 (1.97)	61.2 (2.41)	50.1 (1.97)	49.9 (1.96)	60.1 (2.37)	46.5 (1.83)	58.4 (2.30)	622.4 (24.50)
Average precipitation days (≥ 1.0 mm)	10.1	9.0	10.2	8.8	10.0	8.1	7.5	7.3	7.9	9.2	9.6	10.6	108.4
Source: Meteociel

Climate data for Paris
Month	Jan	Feb	Mar	Apr	May	Jun	Jul	Aug	Sep	Oct	Nov	Dec	Year
Average Ultraviolet index	1	2	3	4	6	7	7	6	4	3	1	1	3.8
Source: Weather Atlas

Climate data for Paris
Month	Jan	Feb	Mar	Apr	May	Jun	Jul	Aug	Sep	Oct	Nov	Dec	Year
Record high °C (°F)	17.5 (63.5)	22.9 (73.2)	27.3 (81.1)	31.5 (88.7)	36.0 (96.8)	42.2 (108.0)	42.6 (108.7)	40.5 (104.9)	36.2 (97.2)	33.0 (91.4)	23.5 (74.3)	17.7 (63.9)	42.6 (108.7)
Record low °C (°F)	−16.8 (1.8)	−15.0 (5.0)	−9.6 (14.7)	−4.3 (24.3)	−1.5 (29.3)	2.8 (37.0)	4.5 (40.1)	4.7 (40.5)	1.5 (34.7)	−5.6 (21.9)	−14.0 (6.8)	−23.9 (−11.0)	−23.9 (−11.0)
