= Nestor Roqueplan =

French writer, journalist, and theatre director (1805–1870)

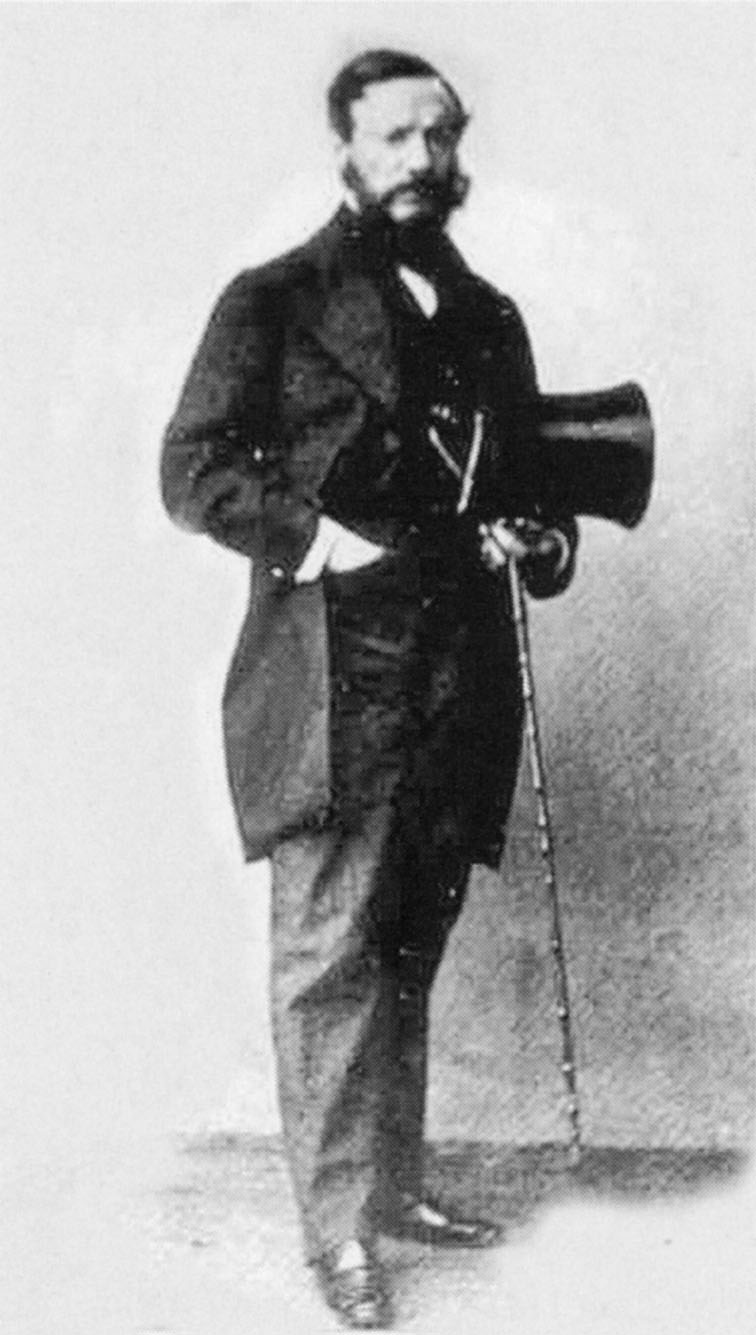
Nestor Roqueplan

Louis-Victor-Nestor Roqueplan [also sometimes spelled Rocoplan] (16 September 1805 – 24 April 1870) was a French writer, journalist, and theatre director.

== Early life and career ==
Nestor Roqueplan was born near Montréal, Aude, and was the younger brother of the Romantic painter Camille Roqueplan. He first studied in Marseille, where he completed his secondary education in law, but moved to Paris in 1825, where he was able to publish several literary essays, and joined Le Figaro in 1827, becoming its editor-in-chief with Victor Bohain, who had purchased the paper that year for 30,000 francs.

Roqueplan was considered a dandy, and witty and caustic as a writer. He was an amateur magician, and in about 1830 invented the silk braid trim on trouser seams, which became highly fashionable. He wrote as a critic, and in 1833 he fought a duel with a Colonel Gallois, who was offended by an article in Le Figaro. Roqueplan was wounded but recovered.

Roqueplan also served as a theatre director at the Théâtre du Panthéon, the Théâtre des Nouveautés, and from 1841 to 1847 at the Théâtre des Variétés.

== Paris Opera ==
Roqueplan and Henri Duponchel joined Léon Pillet as co-directors of the Paris Opera on 1 August 1847. Under pressure from increasing criticism of his previous policies, Pillet withdrew completely in November, leaving Roqueplan and Duponchel as co-directors until 21 November 1849, when Duponchel decided to retire. Roqueplan continued as sole director until 11 November 1854, when he was replaced by François-Louis Crosnier. The two most notable premieres at the Opera during his period as director were Verdi's Jérusalem in 1847, which was not particularly successful, and Meyerbeer's Le prophète in 1849 (with mezzo-soprano Pauline Viardot, who had enormous success in the role of Fidès). Later, in 1851, he mounted Gounod's first opera, Sapho, as a favor to Viardot, who sang the title role. In 1852 he produced Halévy's 5-act grand opera Le Juif errant, which was well received by many critics and achieved a total of 49 performances, but also resulted in the publication of a defense and critique of the opera in the form of a letter by Roqueplan to Constitutionnel and a critique by Jules Janin from the Journal des Debats. Overall Roqueplan's management of the Opera was considered disastrous, and he was forced out of his position as director, but the financial problems at the Opera failed to damage his personal fortune, and he was well-paid for his service.

About this time he published two books, the first in 1853 about life in Paris titled Regain – La vie parisienne, and the second in 1855 consisting of theatre gossip called Coulisses de l'Opéra.

== Opéra-Comique ==
On 20 November 1857 Roqueplan succeeded Émile Perrin as director of the Opéra-Comique, and held the position until 19 June 1860, when he was replaced by Alfred Beaumont. The first new work to be presented under Roqueplan was Ambroise Thomas's 3-act Le carnaval de Venise on 9 December. At the beginning of 1859 Roqueplan brought suit against Le Figaro for harassment regarding his directorship. According to The Literary Gazette of London, the Figaro had described Roqueplan as "a species of Pasha, lolling upon a couch, smoking a cigar, and desirous only of escaping from all the details of his administration." Not long thereafter came the triumphant premiere of Meyerbeer's Le pardon de Ploërmel, but despite its success, his financial difficulties increased. Eventually the constant money problems caused him to retire from opera management.

== Later life ==
He wrote as a columnist for Constitutionnel and in 1868 published two booklets (drawn from obituaries he had written for that journal), one about Rossini and another about Baron James de Rothschild. The same year he also published a book of literary sketches of Paris as Parisine.

Roqueplan remained unmarried and died in Paris.

== See also ==
- Suzanne Lagier
