= Thérésa (singer) =

French singer

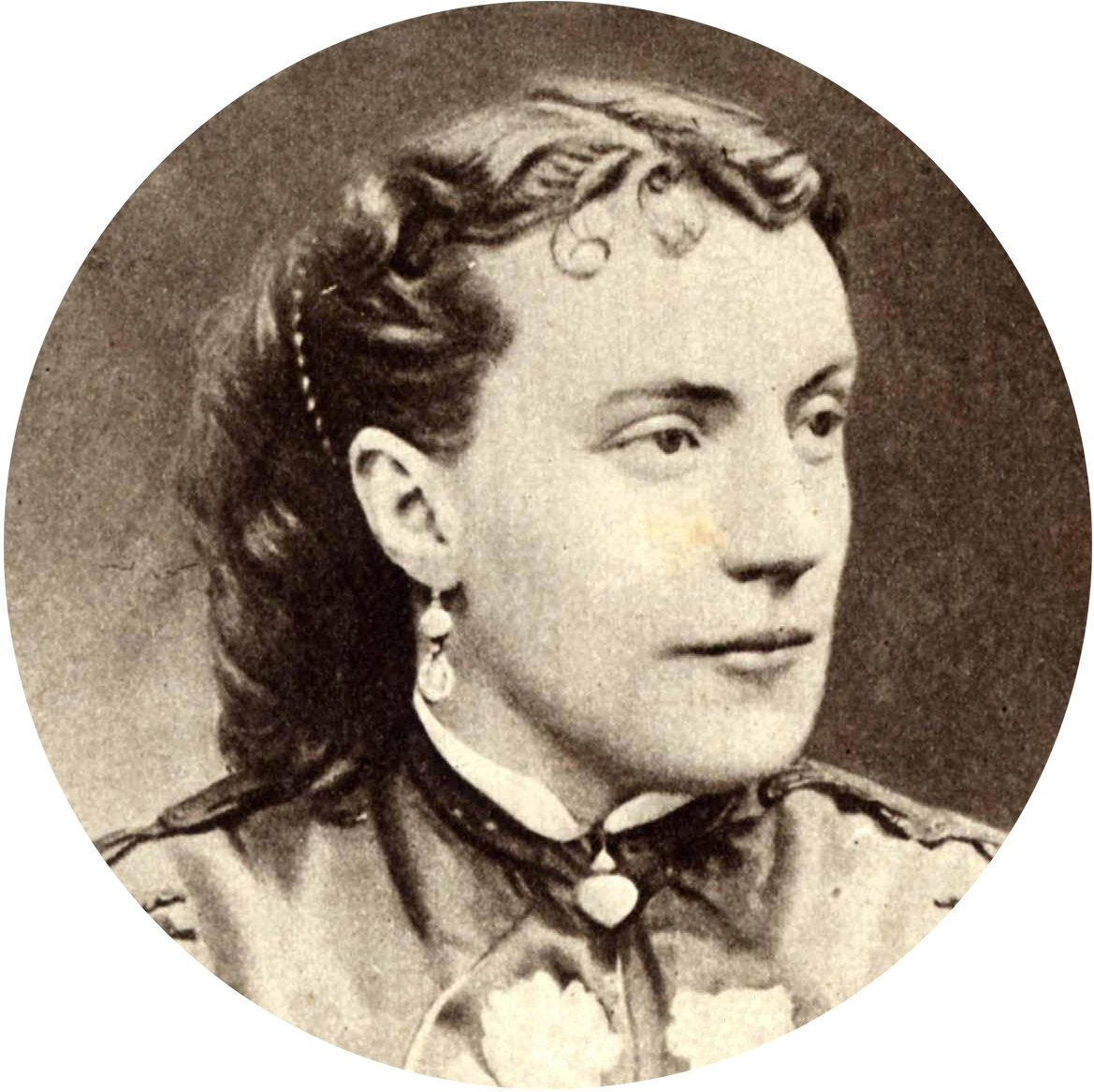
- Portrait of the singer Thérésa by Étienne Carjat en 1870.
- Born: Désirée Emma Valladon; 7 September 1836; La Bazoche-Gouet
- Died: 14 May 1913 (aged 76); Neufchâtel-en-Saosnois
- Resting place: Père Lachaise Cemetery
- Occupation: Singer, modiste

Signature
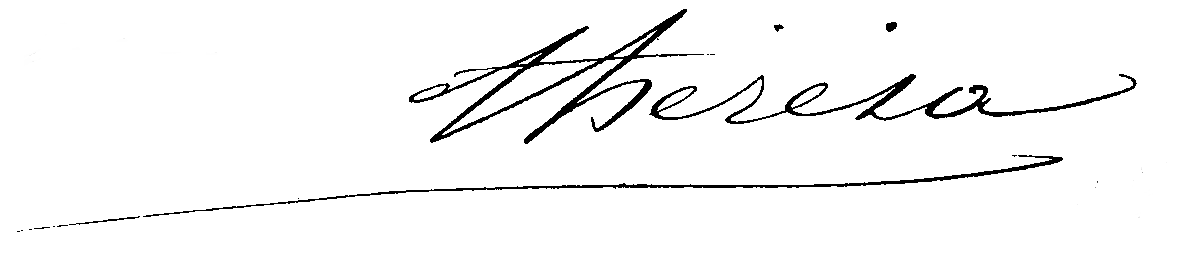

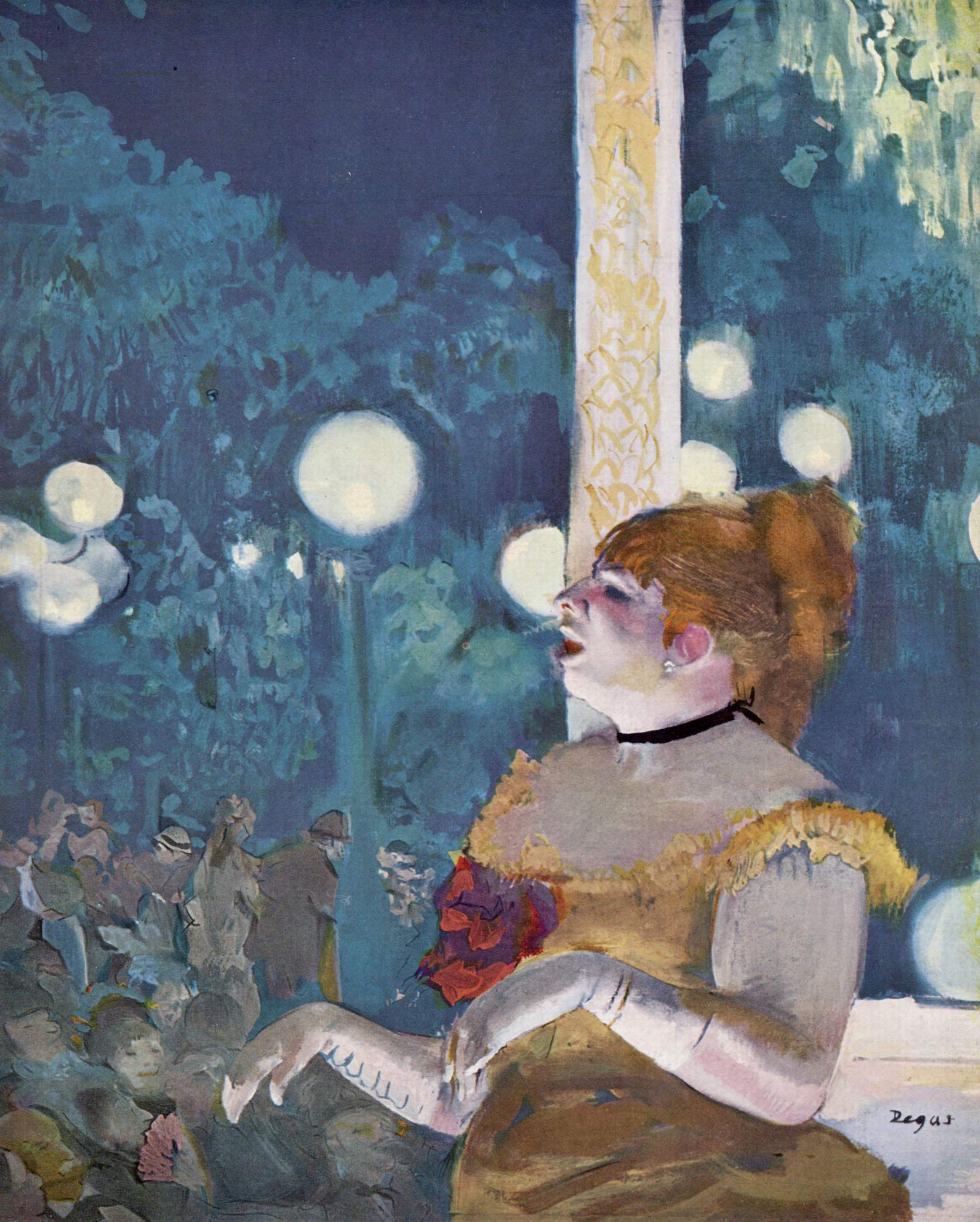
Thérésa portrayed in La Chanson du chien by Edgar Degas between 1875 and 1877

Thérésa (born Désirée Emma Valladon but cited simply as Emma Valladon; 7 September 1836 — 14 May 1913) was a French singer. She often worked with Suzanne Lagier and had cartoons (caricatures) drawn by André Gill of her for the newspaper La Lune.

les canards tyroliens (the yodling ducks) is an 1869 French song on the freedom of assembly created by Thérésa and performed in 1930 by Yvonne Gabaroche.

== Biography ==
Désirée Emma Valladon (but often cited simply as Emma Valladon) was born the daughter of a musician in La Bazoche-Gouet in the Eure-et-Loir department of France on 7 September 1836. As a child, Valladon dreamt of being a singer but began her career working in fashion studios.

She began her singing career by performing in small café chantants (cafe concerts) in Paris, such as in the Café Moka, Théâtre de la Porte Saint-Martin and the Café des Giants, enjoying modest success. During a Christmas show, Valladon was noticed by Arsène Goubert, the director of the café chantant Alcazar, who offered her three hundred francs to sing there; at this she began to use the stage name Thérésa. Within a month of her arrival at the Alcazar, Thérésa enjoyed great success both with the public and critics, and also later went to perform in Rome, Italy, and Saint Petersburg, Russia. She often worked with Suzanne Lagier and in the case of "El", they were appreciated by the public but not the critics. Increasing her popularity, Thérésa was depicted in several cartoons (caricatures) by André Gill in the newspaper La Lune. From 1867 to 1869, she took a break from singing as a result of laryngitis, which made her lose her voice, but then returned with the "popular" Les canards tyroliens.

Some of her most successful songs' choruses were sung by many people, including La gardeuse d'ours del (1863), Rien n'est sacré pour un sapeur! (1864) and La femme à barbe del (1865). She was "admired" by Alexandre Dumas, Théodore de Banville, Pauline von Metternich and Napoleon III. She was financially very successful; earning around 100,000 francs a year. She retired in 1893, but returned to the stage for an evening to perform Le Chat Noir the following year. She retired for good in 1895 when she went to live in Sarthe, where she died in 1913. She was buried at Père Lachaise Cemetery.

== Caricatures ==
Caricatures de Thérésa

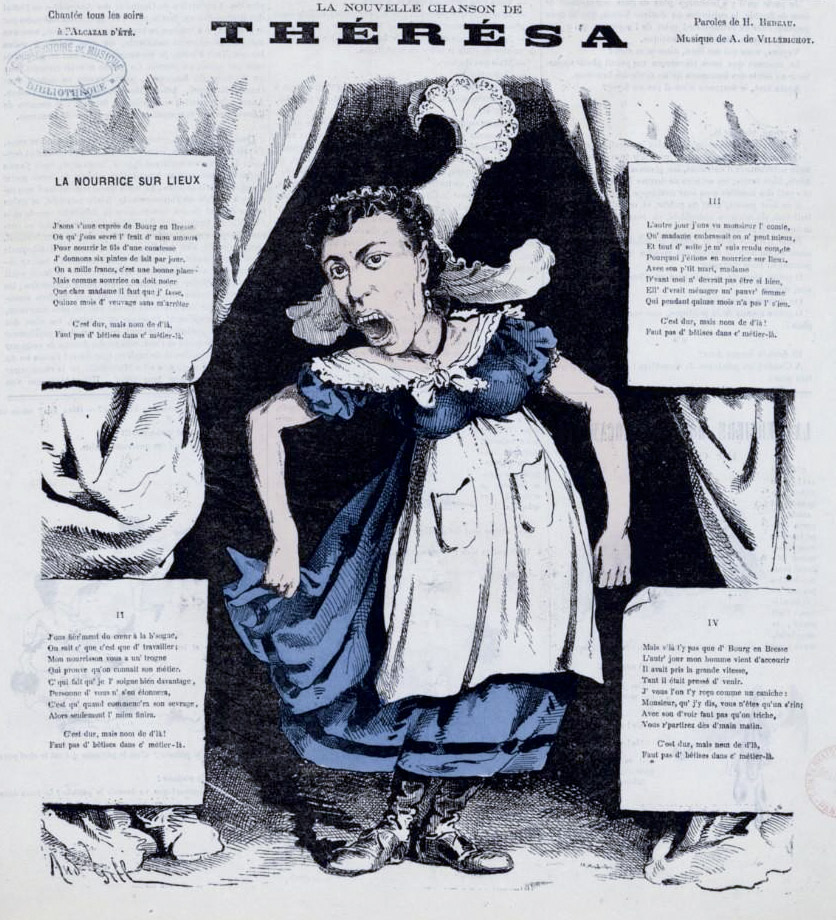
Caricature by André Gill (1866).

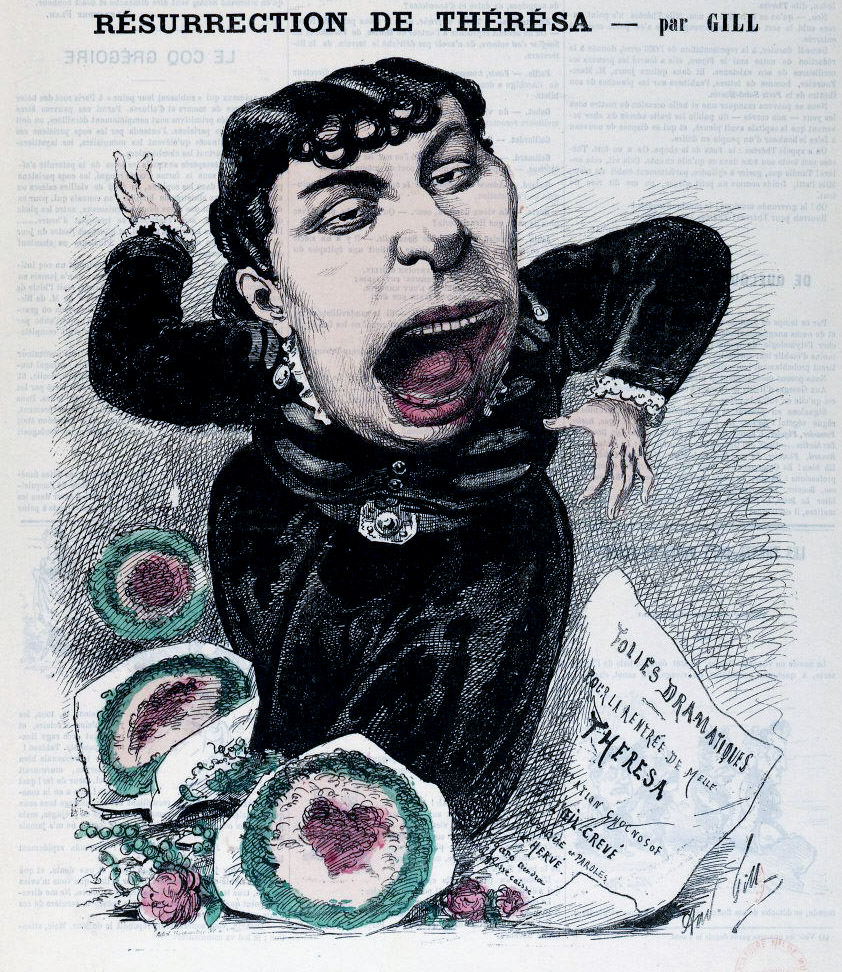
Caricature by André Gill (1867).

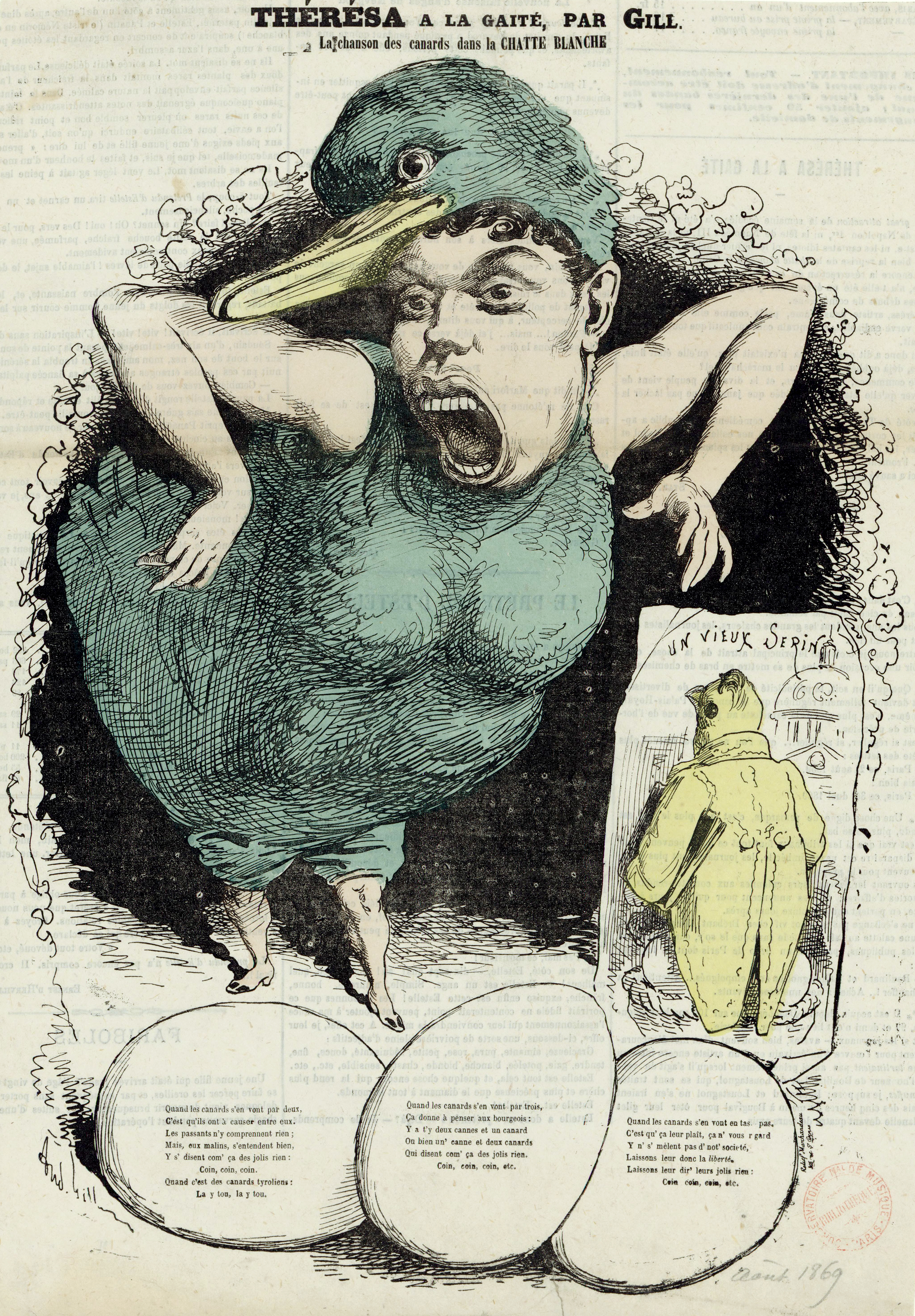
Caricature by André Gill (1869).

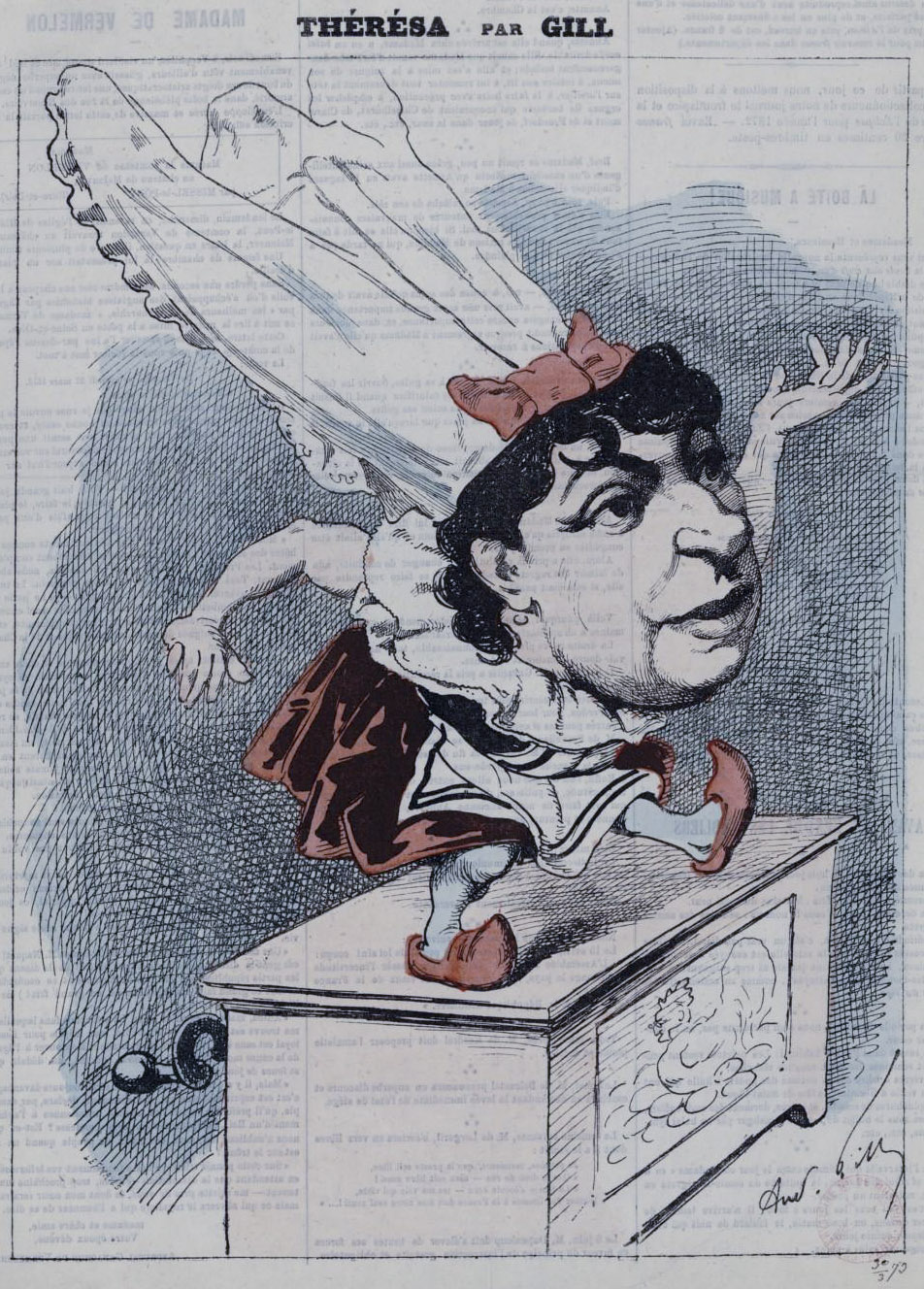
Caricature by André Gill (1873).

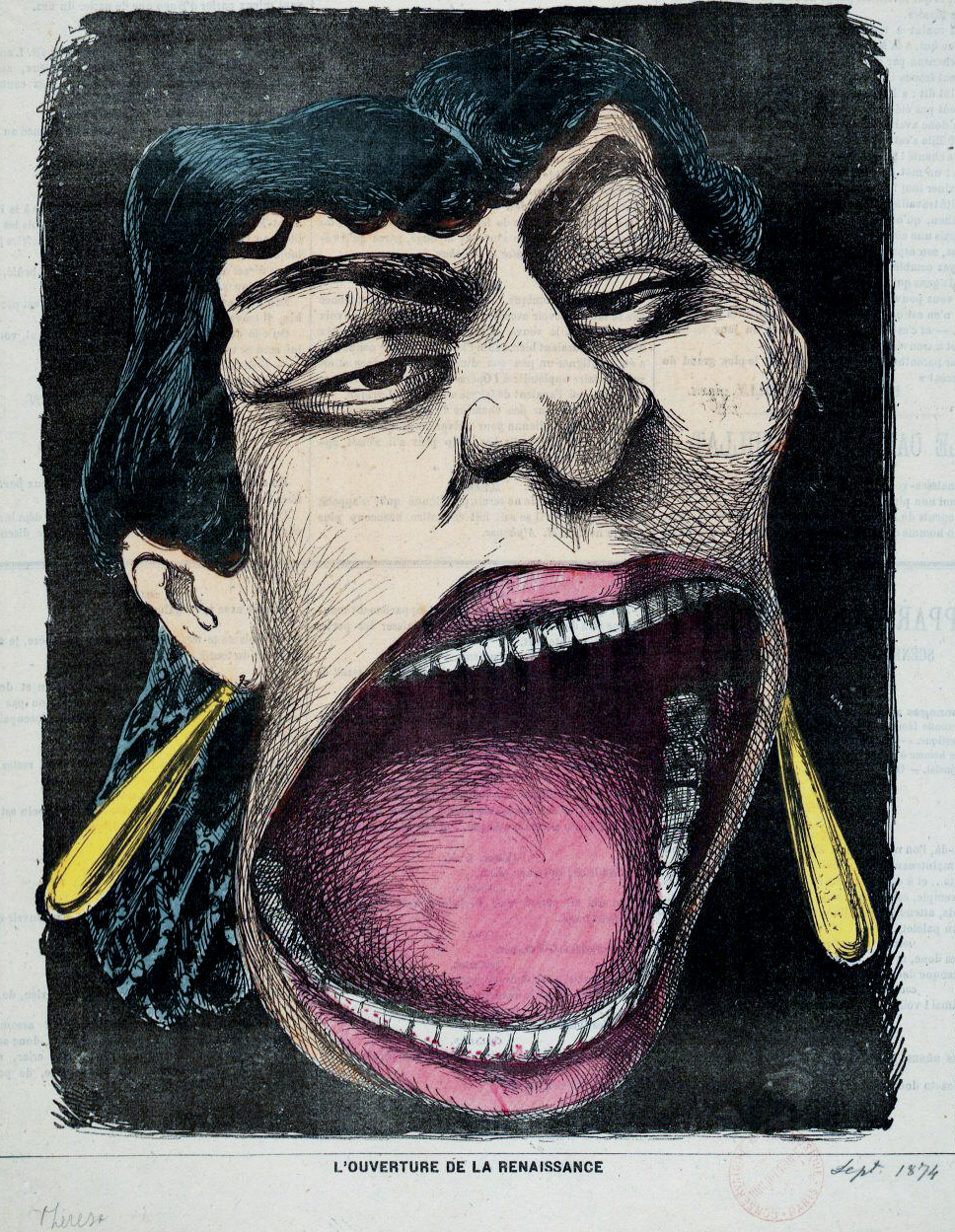
Caricature by André Gill (1874).

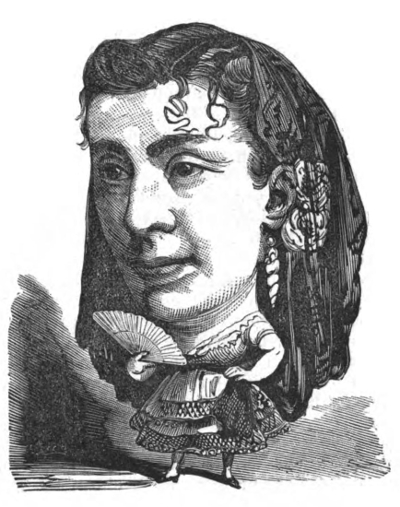
Caricature dans Le Trombinoscope de Touchatout (1873).

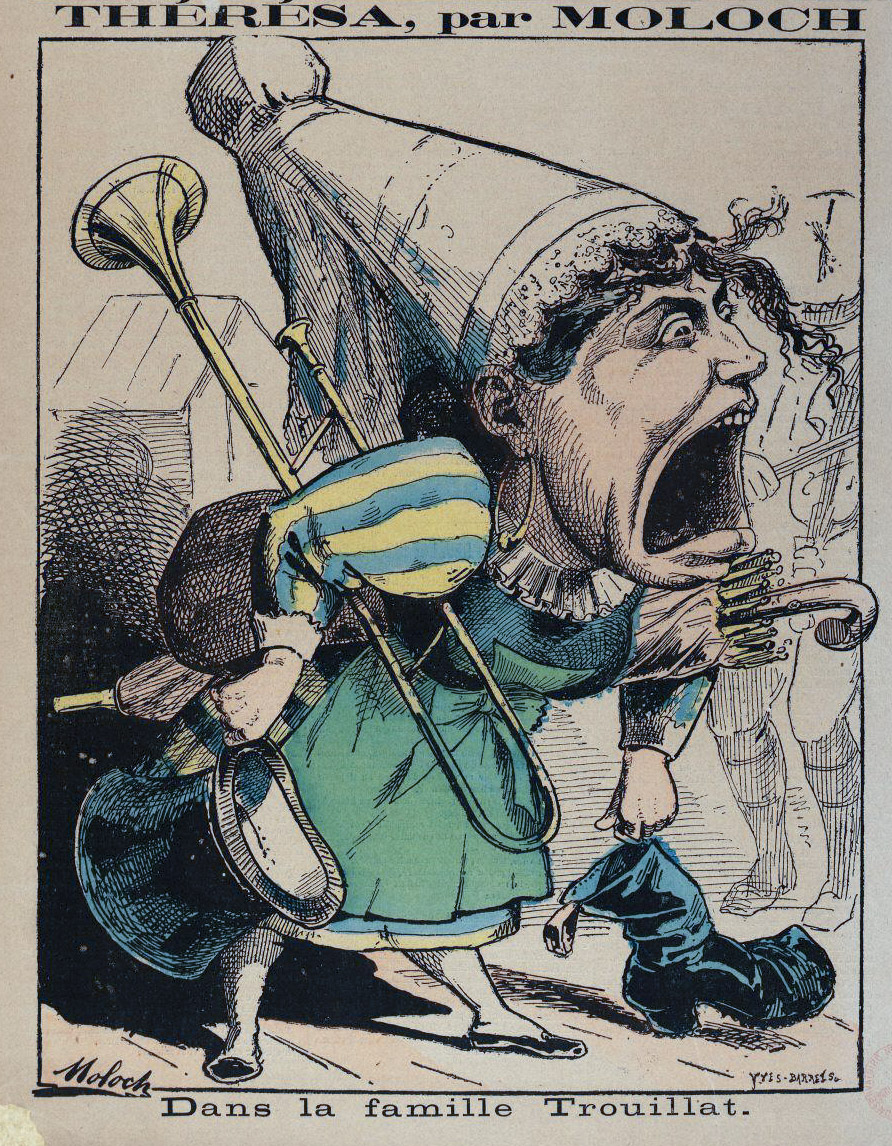
Caricature par Moloch (1874)

== Sources ==
- Mémoires de Thérésa, écrits par elle-même, Paris, E. Dentu éditeur, 1865 (sur Gallica)
- Thérésa et ses chansons, Paris, Le Bailly éditeur, 1866
- Jacqueline Blanche, Thérésa, première idole de la chanson française (1837-1913), La Fresnay-sur-Chedouet, 1981.
- Pierre-Robert Leclercq, Thérésa, la diva du ruisseau, Paris, A. Carrière, impr., 2006.
