= Pont Cardinet station (Paris Metro) =

Paris Metro station

Pont Cardinet
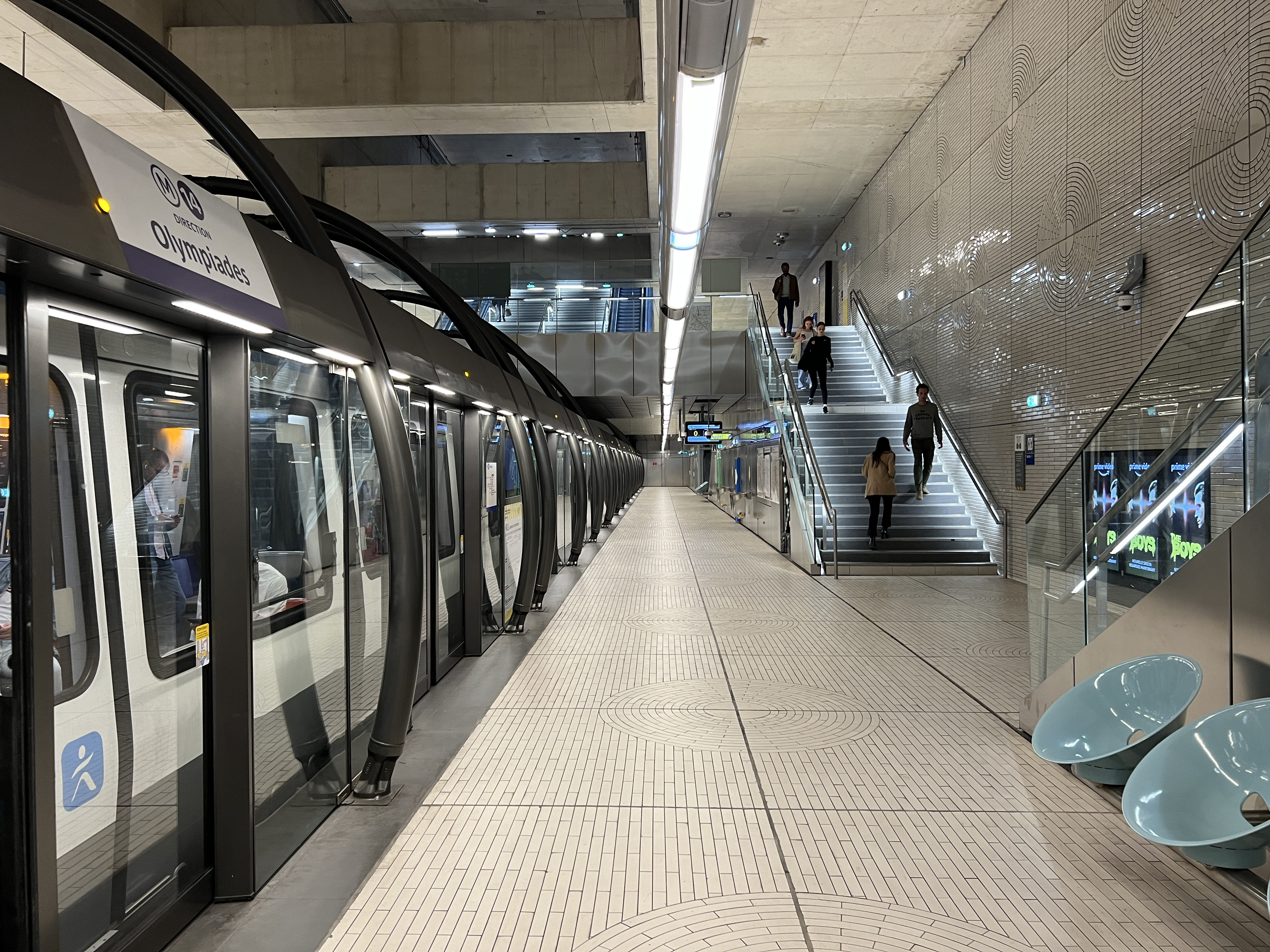
- MP 14 rolling stock at Pont Cardinet

General information
- Location: 17th arrondissement of Paris; Île-de-France; France
- Coordinates: 48°53′22″N 2°18′55″E
- Owner: RATP Group
- Connections: at Pont Cardinet

Construction
- Accessible: Yes

Other information
- Fare zone: 1

History
- Opened: 14 December 2020

Services
Preceding station	Paris Metro	Following station
Porte de Clichy towards Saint-Denis–Pleyel	Line 14	Saint-Lazare towards Aéroport d'Orly
Location
- Location within Paris

Pont Cardinet (French pronunciation: [pɔ̃ kaʁdinɛ]; lit. 'Cardinet Bridge') is a station on Line 14 of the Paris Metro located in the Batignolles neighbourhood of the 17th arrondissement. It was opened on 14 December 2020 as part of the extension to Mairie de Saint-Ouen and is located nearby to Pont Cardinet station.

== History ==
As part of the public consultation on the extension of Line 14 to Mairie de Saint-Ouen launched in January 2010, many contributors called for a Metro station at Pont Cardinet. The STIF manager indicated, in summary of this consultation, that he would propose to the STIF Board to establish if this could be achieved.

In 2011, the diagram outlining the desaturation of Line 13 considered the geological complexities including the risks of land settlement impacting existing city planning, which lead STIF to rule out the idea of a connection of Line 14 with the Rome Metro station on Line 2 to favour a connection at Pont Cardinet. This option was supported both by Brigitte Kuster, UMP mayor of the 17th arrondissement, and Annick Lepetit (PS), deputy mayor of Paris for transport.

On 26 January 2011, the State and the Region agreed on the broad guidelines for public transport in Île-de-France until 2025 and, in detail, recorded the planned construction of a station from Line 14 to Pont Cardinet.

An inter-prefectural decree of the prefectures of Seine-Saint-Denis, Hauts-de-Seine and Paris dated 4 October 2012 declared the extension of Line 14 to be of public utility.

Construction of the Pont Cardinet station was entrusted to the Eiffage TP/Razel-Bec11 consortium. The station was constructed as excavated vault, with modular walls. The station served as an assembly shaft for Magali, one of the two tunnel boring machines digging the extension of Line 14. The 1,594 meters of tunnel between Pont Cardinet and Saint-Lazare were dug between November 2015 and June 2016 at a depth of twenty meters. The station was once again used to relaunch the tunnel boring machine, renamed Yolène, to the north.

The station opened on 14 December 2020.

During the 18 days the station was open at the end of 2020, 112,229 passengers entered it, which places it in 302nd position among metro stations for its attendance out of 304 for this year.

In 2021, the first full year of operation, attendance stands at 4,168,538 passengers entering, which places it in 50th position among metro stations for attendance. Pont Cardinet is the Paris metro station that experienced the fastest growth within its first year of operation in history.

== Passenger services ==
=== Access ===
The station has two entrances:

- Rue Cardinet – equipped with an elevator and an escalator;
- Rue Mstislav-Rostropovich – equipped with an escalator.

=== Platforms ===
The station has a floor area of 4,290 m^{2}, a length of 120.5 m and a width of 20.65 m. Its platforms are located at a depth of 20 meters. The furniture is of the Akiko style, pale blue in colour.

=== Other connections ===
The station is a few dozen meters from the Gare de Pont Cardinet, which is the first station after Gare Saint-Lazare towards the western suburbs and the only station that is not served by the RER or mainline trains. It is served by trains of line L of the Transilien, group II, from Gare Saint-Lazare to Gare Versailles-Rive-Droite, and group III, from Nanterre-Université station to Maisons-Laffitte station and the Cergy-le-Haut station. Access between station and the metro is via an external sidewalk.

The station connects with the RATP Bus Network, lines 31, 66 and 94 as well as with line 28 extended from Gare Saint-Lazare to Porte de Clichy.

== Nearby ==
- Parc Clichy-Batignolles – Martin-Luther-King
- Square des Batignolles
- Clichy-Batignolles district

== Gallery ==
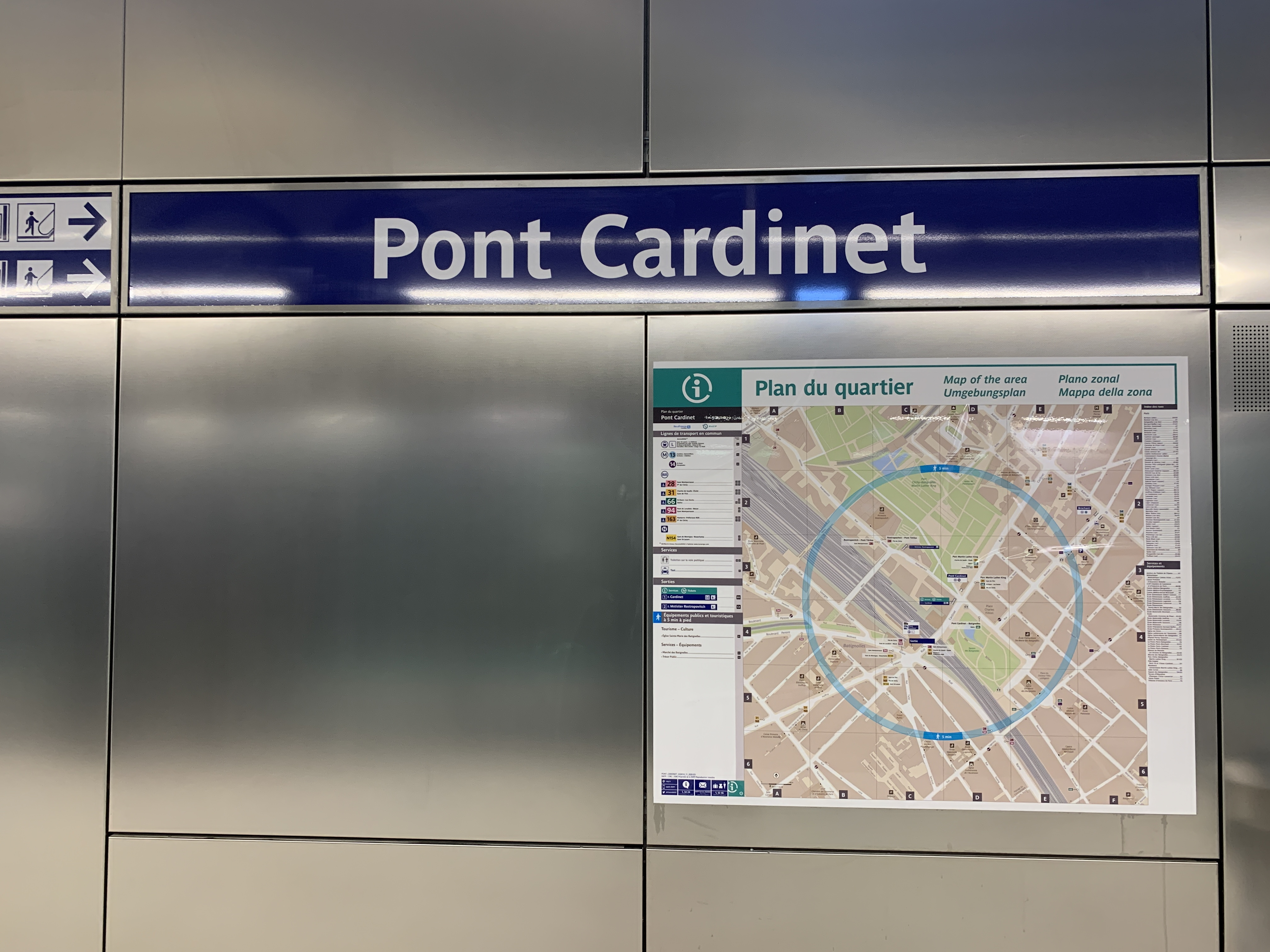
Map

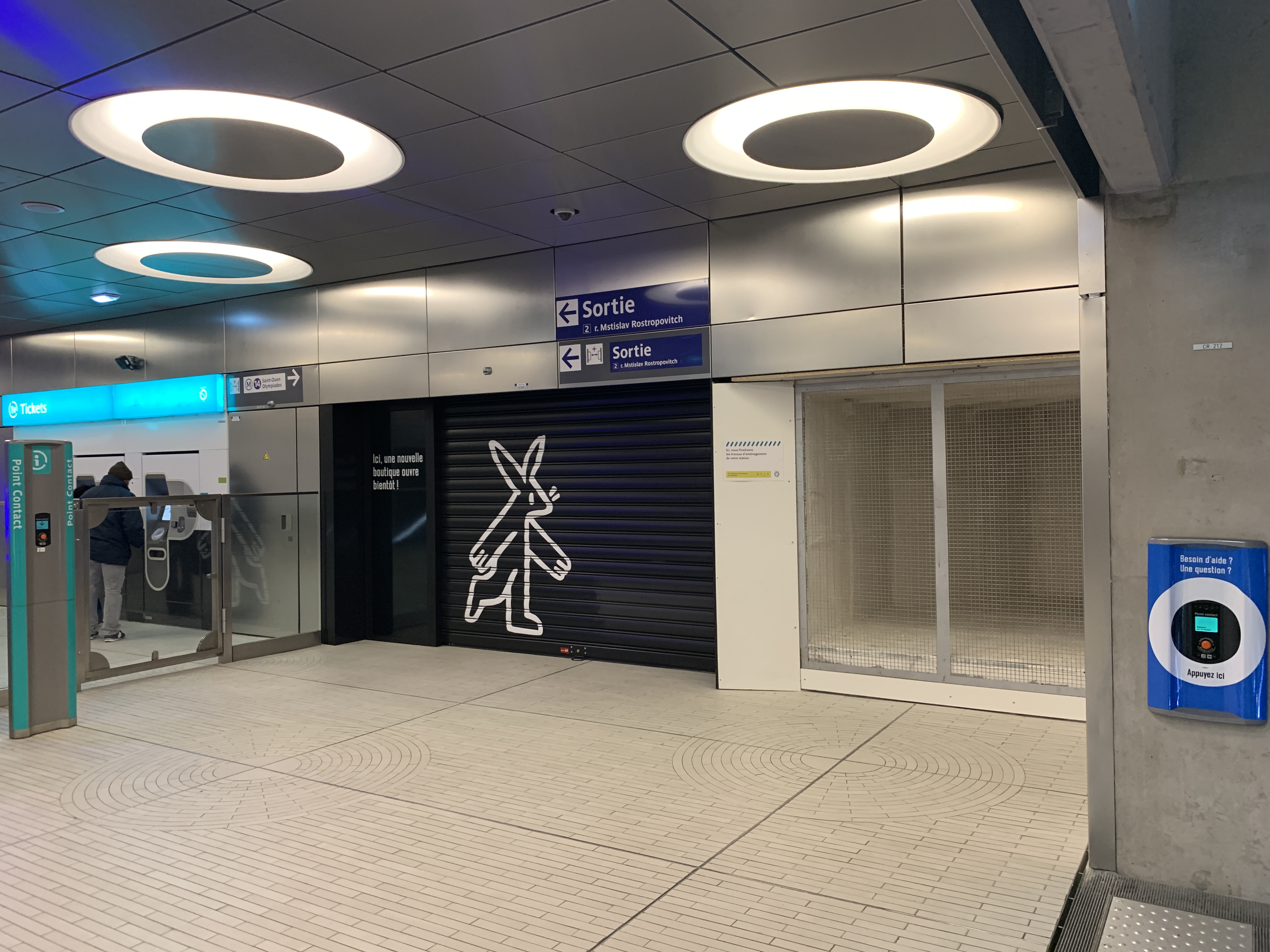
Rabbit of the Paris Metro

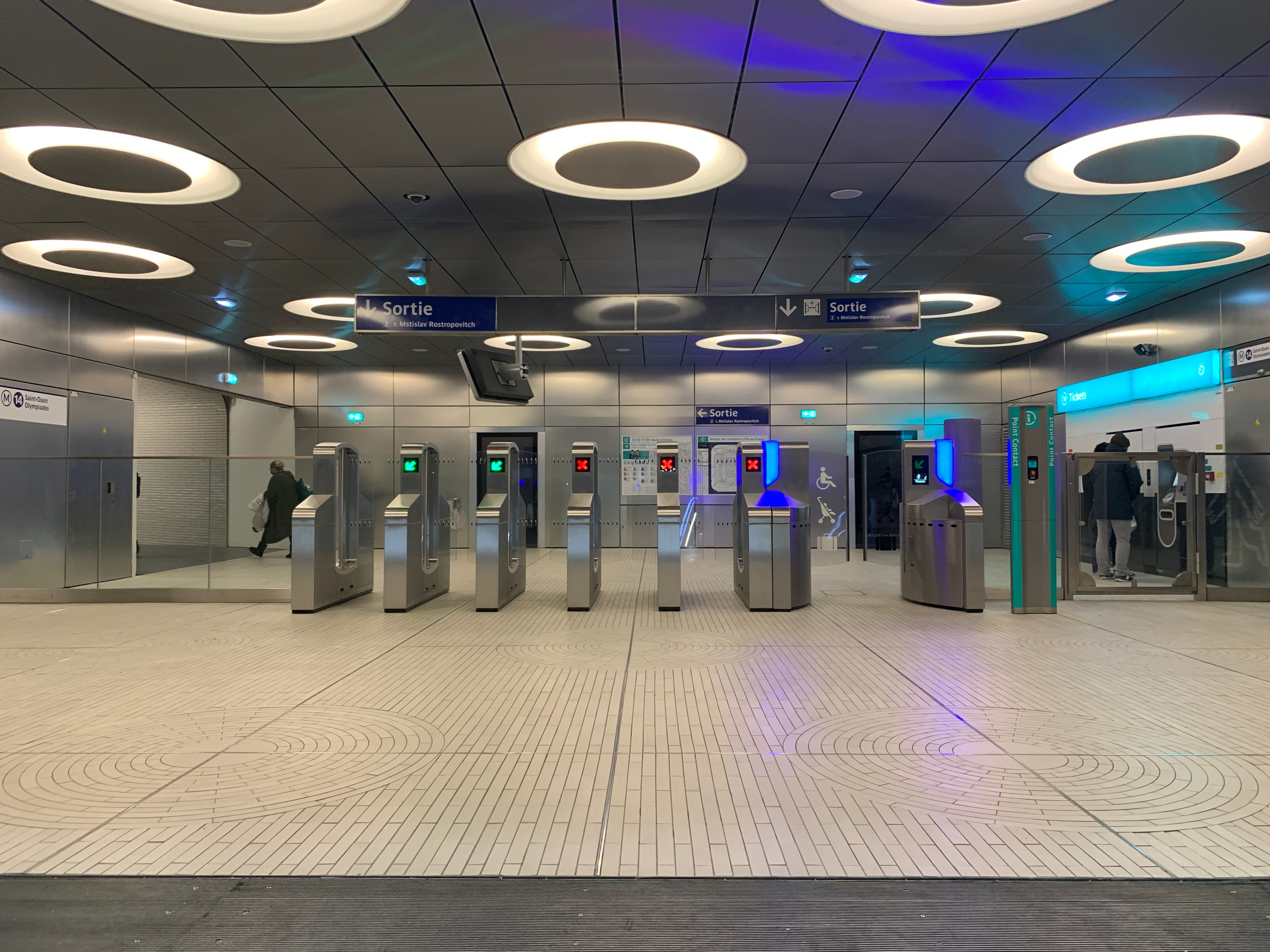
Concourse

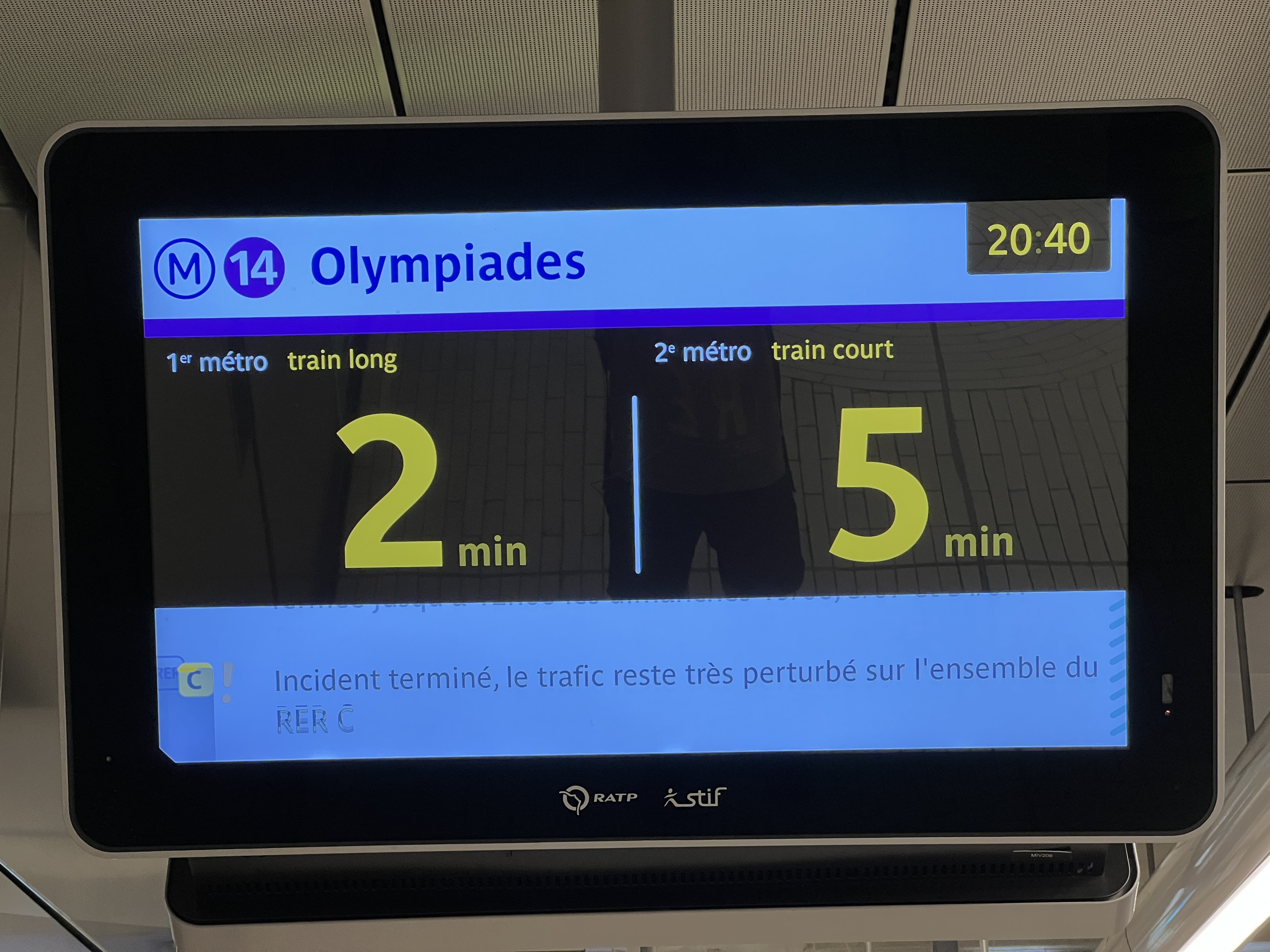
SIEL panel at Pont Cardinet. The first train will an MP 14 (for long trains), second train will an MP 89 or MP 05 (for short trains).

== See also ==
- Pont Cardinet station
