= Eugène Dufriche =

French opera singer

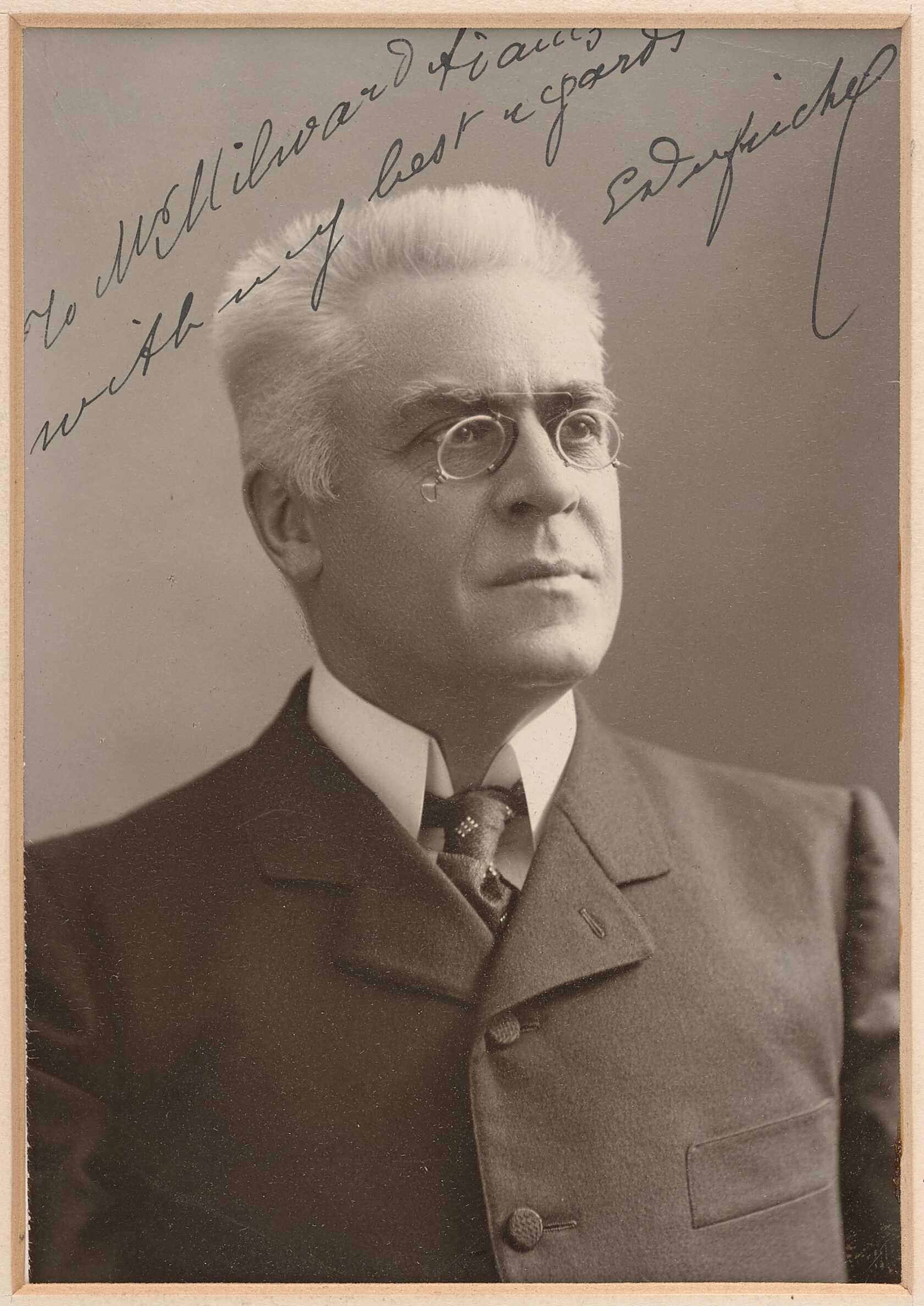
Eugène Dufriche (Newberry Library, Chicago)

Eugène Dufriche (born 1848, date of death unknown) was a French baritone, who had a career on the operatic stage from the 1870s in Paris through to the 1900s in New York.

== Life and career ==
Having studied at the Conservatoire de Paris, Dufriche sang Lothario from Mignon at the prize concert in 1873.

Dufriche made his debut at the Paris Opéra-Comique on 27 August 1874 as Loïc in Le pardon de Ploërmel going on to sing in the 100th performance of the piece that September. On 3 March 1875 he sang Zuniga in the world premiere of Bizet’s Carmen at the Opéra-Comique. In December 1875 he sang the judge in the centenary performances of Le calife de Bagdad by Boieldieu and in 1876 he sang Girot in Le pré aux clercs. In 1878 he undertook Roland in Les mousquetaires de la reine and Amgiad in La statue.

In 1879 he appeared as Scindia in Le roi de Lahore in Genoa. That year he also appeared in the Opéra-Populaire season at the Théâtre de la Gaîté, as Capulet in the Marquis d'Ivry's Amants de Vérone, Montauban in Gilles de Bretagne by Kowalski, and Sainte-Croix in Paul et Virginie. He left the Opéra-Comique in early 1882 to tour as a guest artist.

Dufriche appeared in Monte Carlo in 1883 as Valentin in Faust and Lothario in Mignon; Walsh comments that "like so many male singers of the period he appears to have been afflicted with the tremolo." His association with the Royal Opera House, London, began in 1890, and continued until 1905, roles including Quasimodo in Esmeralda, Rabbi Davide in L'amico Fritz, creating Bustamente in La Navarraise, and Amonasro in Aida. He also sang in St Petersburg, Buenos Aires and at the Teatro di San Carlo Naples, as well as returning to the Paris Opera as Alphonse in La favorite, Telramund in Lohengrin and Amonasro in Aida. In March 1892 he sang the 2nd tableau of the first act of Parsifal (in French) in a Paris Conservatoire concert conducted by Danbé.

Between 1893 and 1908 Dufriche appeared regularly at the Metropolitan Opera, New York, mainly in supporting roles. In this time he also taught at the National Conservatory of Music of America. His wide repertoire there included roles in three Mozart operas, Donizetti and Rossini, the French repertory (including returning to Carmen as Dancaire), three Meyerbeer operas, four Verdi operas, five Wagner operas, Italian verismo and operetta.

In 1880 he married singer Suzanne Lagier in London.
