= Suzanne Lagier =

French theatre actress and opera singer (1833–1893)

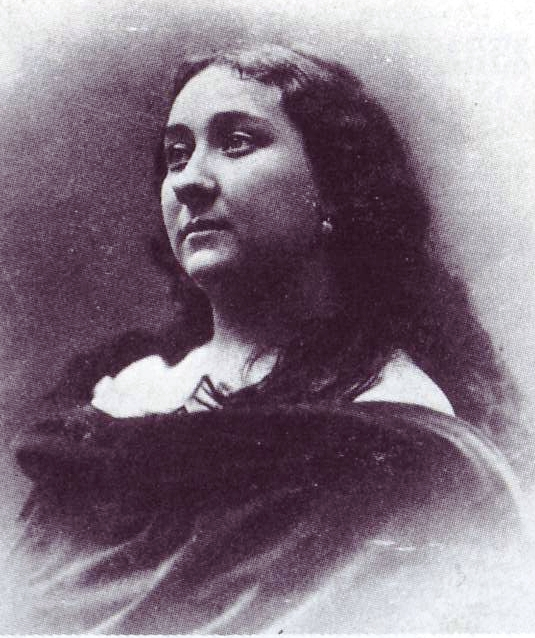
- Born: 30 November 1833; Dunkirk
- Died: 1893 (aged 59–60)
- Occupation(s): Actress, singer

Suzanne Lagier (30 November 1833 – 1893) was a French theatre actress and an opera singer. She often performed with Thérésa and made many appearances in Paris and Saint Petersburg.

== Biography ==
Lagier was born in Dunkirk on 30 November 1833, in the Rue du Magasin à Poudre, but grew up in a boarding school in Paris and her father was a musician. From an early age, Lagier wanted to be an actress and made her début at age thirteen (in 1846), at the Théâtre des Variétés with the show Veuve de quinze ans, a role which was written for her by Comédie en vaudeville Pierre Adolphe Capelle. After a stay in London, she made her real début at the Théâtre du Palais-Royal in 1848. Later she went to Saint Petersburg in Russia before returning to Paris, where she performed at the Théâtre de l'Ambigu-Comique in 1855, at the Théâtre de la Gaîté in 1856 and finally the Théâtre de la Porte-Saint-Martin in 1859.

In 1865, unusual for the time, she signed a contract with the theatre café-chantant (café-concert) Eldorado, a counterpoint to the growing popularity of singer Thérésa. The café-chantant was relatively successful, and within a few weeks the public elected her as the queen of the café-chantant and also of operetta. However, Lagier was not appreciated by the critics who continued to prefer Thérésa to her. She continued to sing while returning to theatre regularly (both in Paris and Saint Petersburg) until 1880, when she married the tenor (or possibly baritone) Eugène Dufriche in London. She died in 1893.

=== Popularity and criticism ===
Lagier was popular at the time, and she attracted the attention of members of the Jockey-Club de Paris. However, she received sharp criticism from the French newspaper Le Figaro — the collaborator of the magazine, Alfred Delvau, about the name "la grasse", referring to the guttural pronunciation of her R's. Louis-Victor-Nestor Roqueplan opined that Lagier would never learn more than vulgar insolence. Lagier was also the subject of some caricatures, including a satirical newspaper La Lune depicting her and Thérésa.
