= Batignolles =

Administrative quarter in Paris, France

Coordinates: 48°53′15″N 2°19′15″E

Map of the 17th arrondissement with the Quartier des Batignolles

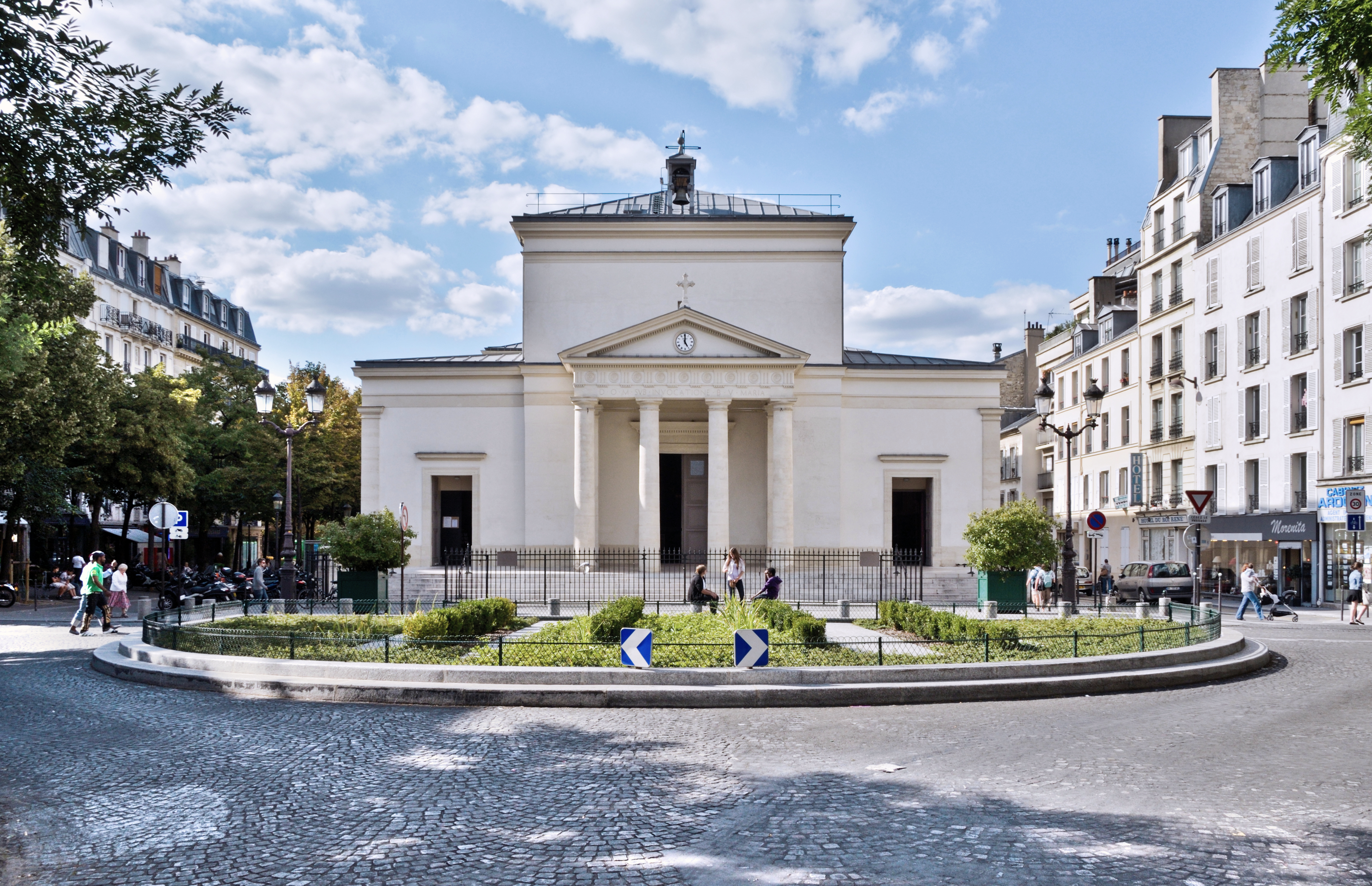
The Sainte-Marie des Batignolles church, in the centre of Batignolles

Batignolles (French pronunciation: [batiɲɔl]) is a neighbourhood of Paris, part of its 17th arrondissement. The neighbourhood is bounded on the south by the Boulevard des Batignolles, on the east by the Avenue de Clichy, on the north by Rue Cardinet and on the west by the Rue de Rome.

== History ==
Batignolles was an independent village outside Paris until 1860, when the emperor, Napoleon III, annexed it to the capital.

During the 19th century, Batignolles had an active cultural life, and it served as a base for the painter Édouard Manet and his friends, who became known as the Batignolles group. They painted many scenes of its café life.

== 21st century ==
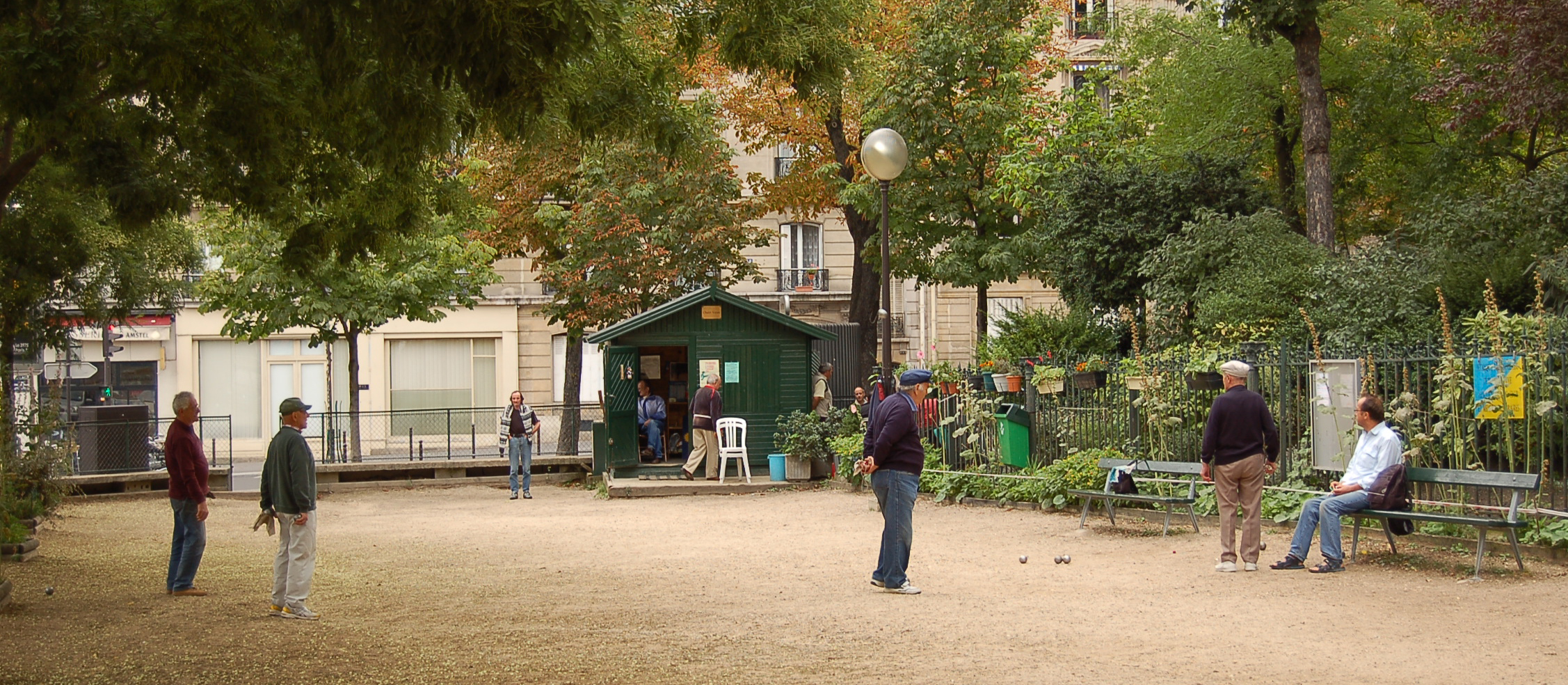
Pétanque, the outdoor bowling-game, as played in Batignolles

Batignolles is outside the center of Paris most visited by tourists, but attractions include the Batignolles Cemetery (which is actually located in the nearby Épinettes district), and the Square des Batignolles, a small park created in 1862.

It was intended that Batignolles would include the Olympic Village, had Paris hosted the 2012 Olympic Games. Former SNCF railyards were expected to be redeveloped as part of this process. It was intended that, after the Olympics (by 2015), the neighborhood would include 3,400 apartments, 30,000 square metres of shops, 140,000 square metres of office buildings and new public facilities (including a school and nursery). Moreover, major public buildings including the Palais de Justice court complex and the Police judiciaire building (previously located in the Île de la Cité), were expected to move to the new Cité judiciaire de Paris building, north of the garden.

The former railyards have instead been redeveloped into a new 4.3-hectare district, centered on the Parc Clichy-Batignolles – Martin-Luther-King.

== Metro stations ==
Batignolles is:

Located near the Metro stations: La Fourche, Rome, Pont Cardinet and Brochant.

It is served by lines 2, 13 and 14.

== Education ==
The Szkoła Narodowa Polska w Paryżu (Polish school in Paris) is in the Batignolles area.

== Notable people ==
- Jules Bourcier (1797–1873), naturalist and expert on hummingbirds, died in Batignolles.
