= Parc Clichy-Batignolles – Martin Luther King =

Urban park in Paris, France

- Parc Martin Luther King
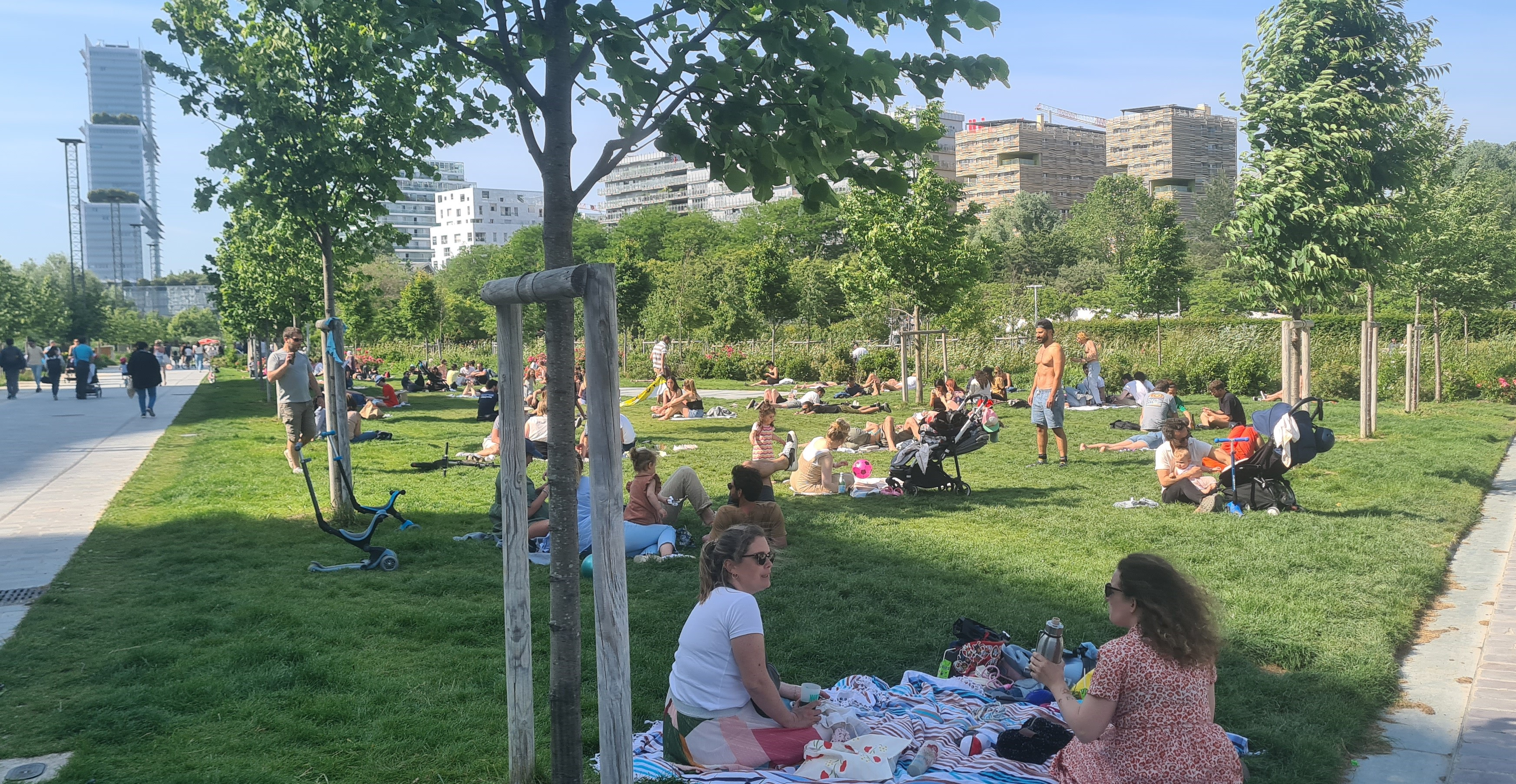
- Parc Clichy-Batignolles
- Interactive map of Parc Clichy-Batignolles – Martin Luther King
- Type: Urban park
- Location: 17th arrondissement, Paris
- Coordinates: 48°53′28″N 2°18′51″E
- Area: 24.71 acres (10.00 ha)
- Opened: 2007, completed 2020
- Designer: Jacqueline Osty
- Status: Open all year
- Public transit: Located near the RER station Porte de Clichy and Metro station Pont Cardinet

The Parc Clichy-Batignolles – Martin Luther King is a green space in Paris' 17th arrondissement (district). Part of the Clichy Batignolles urban development project, the park opened in stages between 2007 and 2021, and covers 10 hectares (25 acres).

== Background ==
It is part of the Clichy Batignolles urban development project, which started in 2001, transforming 54 hectares (130 acres) of land formerly occupied by freight yards for the French railway company SNCF. In the mid 2000s, the site was part of the Paris bid for the 2012 Summer Olympics, being the proposed site of the Olympic Village.

The name of the park is derived from: proximity to the site of a nineteenth century Porte de Clichy, a gate in Paris' Thiers wall that opened to the commune of Clichy, Hauts-de-Seine; proximity to the former SNCF Batignolles station; and a tribute to the legacy of slain civil rights leader Martin Luther King Jr.

The park opened in three phases as part of the Clichy Batignolles project – 4.3 hectares (11 acres) opened in 2007 along Rue Cardinet, growing to 6.5 hectares (16 acres) in 2014 with an expansion north, and a further expansion completed in 2020 to 10 hectares (25 acres). It is the largest green space in the 17th arrondissement, as well as the 8th largest park in Paris.

== Access ==
The park is bordered by Allée Colette-Heilbronner and the Boulevards des Maréchaux to the north, Rue Cardinet to the south and Rue Mstislav Rostropovitch to the west. The nearest Métro stations are Pont Cardinet and Porte de Clichy stations, while the nearest Tram access is the Porte de Clichy stop on the 3b line.

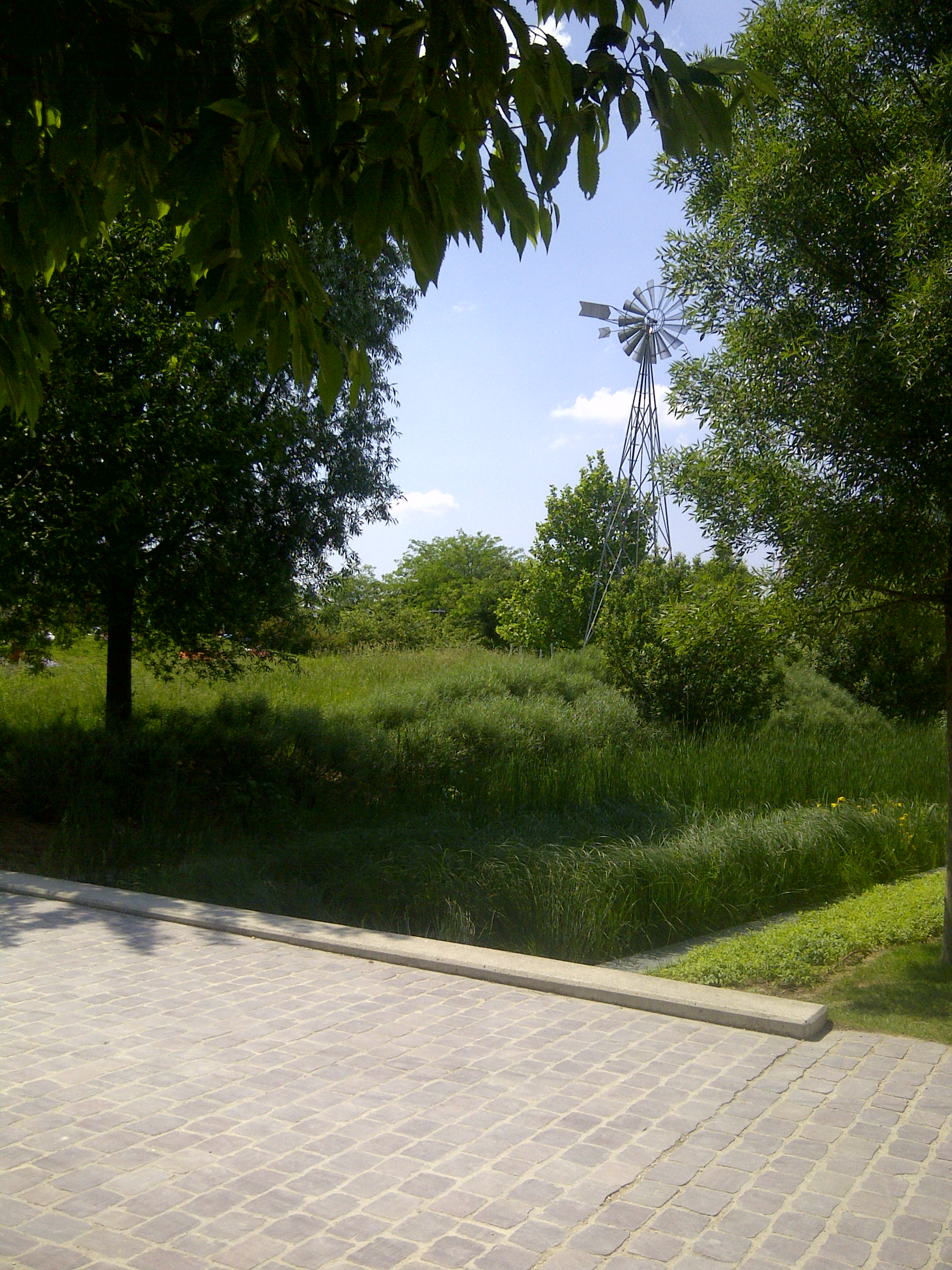
View of one of the wind turbines in the park (2012)

== Grounds and facilities ==
Sustainable principles underpin the design of the park, and features include low maintenance plants; solar panels and wind turbines; reconstituted materials for walkways and rainwater harvesting. Recreation facilities include a skatepark, basketball courts and children's play area.
