= Pont Cardinet station =

Suburban rail station in Paris

Pont Cardinet
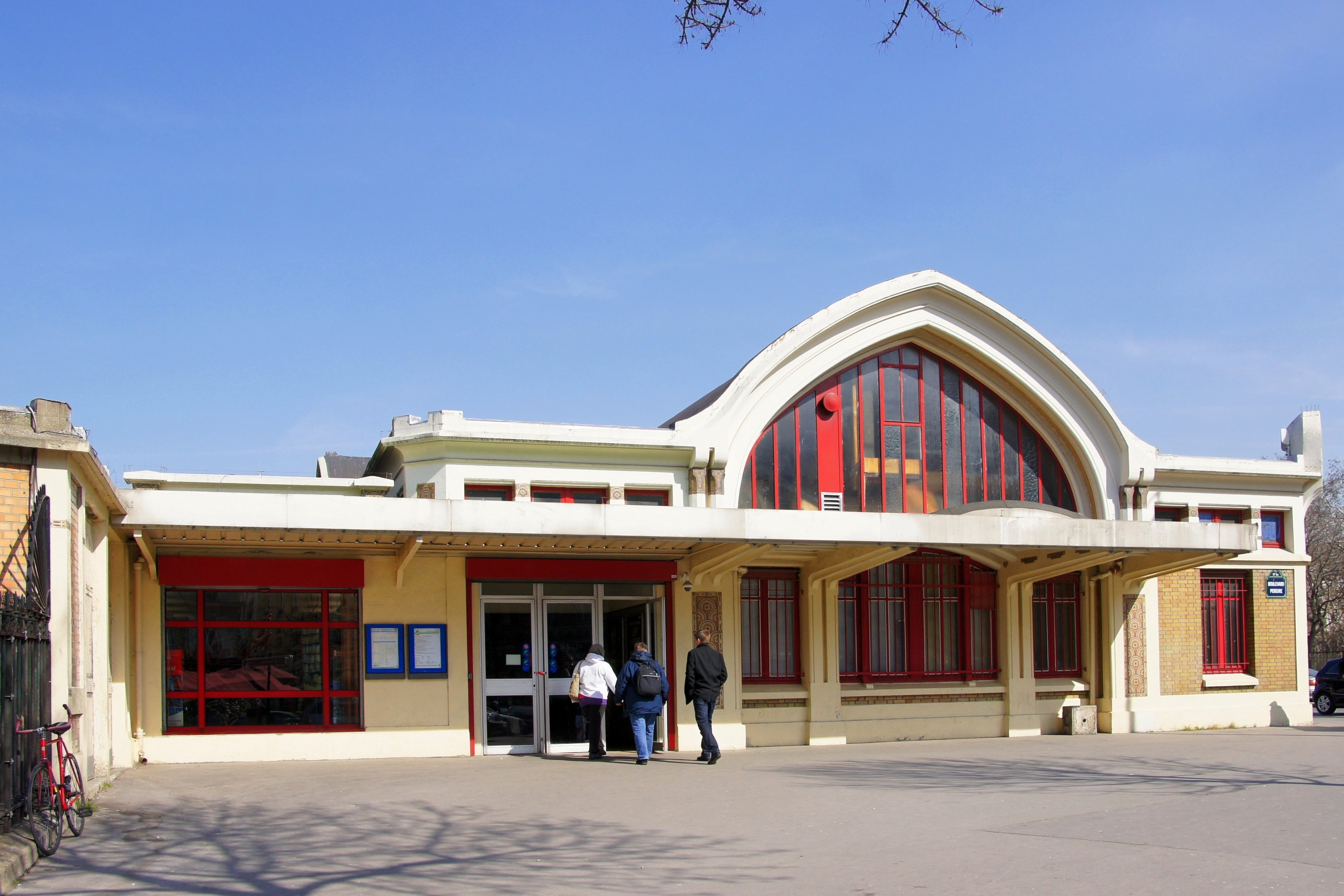
- Station building in 2010

General information
- Location: 145 Rue Cardinet; 17th arrondissement of Paris; France
- Coordinates: 48°53′16″N 2°18′51″E
- Operator: SNCF
- Platforms: 2 island platforms, 1 side platform
- Tracks: 5 + 8 passing tracks
- Connections: at Pont Cardinet

Construction
- Structure type: At-grade
- Accessible: No

Other information
- Station code: 87381111
- Fare zone: 1

History
- Opened: 2 May 1854
- Former names: Gare des Batignolles (1854–1922)

Passengers
- 2024: 7,855,961

Services
| Preceding station | Transilien | Following station |
|---|---|---|
| Clichy–Levallois towards Cergy-le-Haut, Saint-Nom-la-Bretèche or Versailles–Rive Droite | Line L | Paris–Saint Lazare Terminus |
Location

Pont Cardinet (French pronunciation: [pɔ̃ kaʁdinɛ]; lit. 'Cardinet Bridge'; French: Gare de Pont Cardinet) is a railway station in Paris. It is situated on the Paris–Le Havre railway. It is the first station on the line originating from Gare Saint-Lazare in Paris.

The station building is situated above the track level alongside Rue Cardinet. The station is equipped with escalators and Solari destination boards.

The main line continues towards Clichy whilst a small line, now closed, branches off towards Pereire–Levallois and links St Lazare to RER C, this branch was once part of Ligne d'Auteuil and closed in June 1996. Today, there are shuttle buses connecting Pereire–Levallois on RER C. Since December 2020, the station is also connected to Line 14 of the Paris Métro with the construction of the Pont Cardinet Métro station.

== History ==
Originally named Batignolles station (French: Gare des Batignolles), the station opened on 2 May 1854, along with the Auteuil railway.

== Trivia ==
Pont Cardinet is the only SNCF station in the commune of Paris (intra muros) that is not also either a terminus or an RER station.
