= Svenska Skolan Paris =

Swedish international school in Paris, France

Coordinates: 48.8804°N 2.3031°E

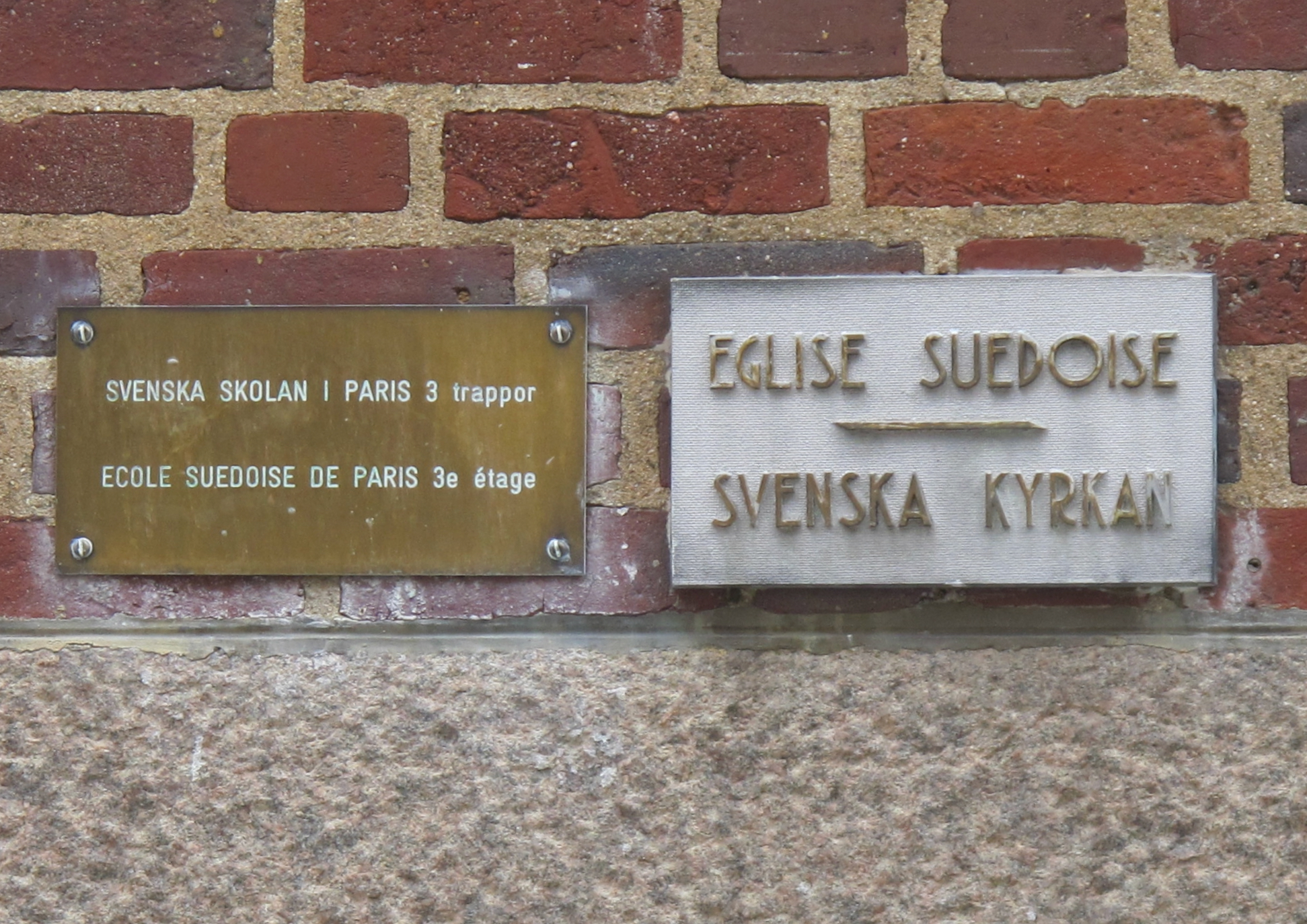
The school is on the third floor of the Church of Sweden in Paris

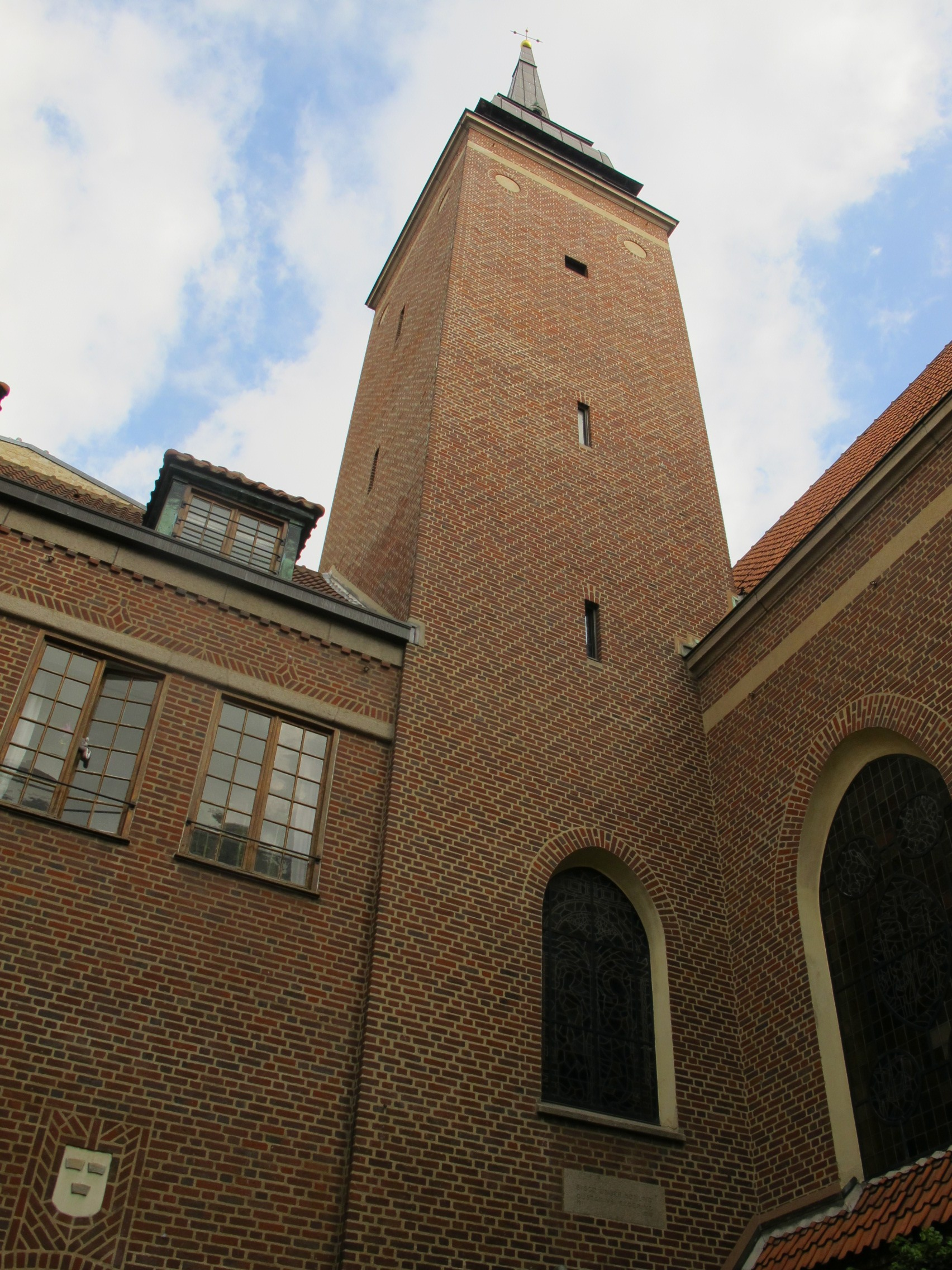
Church of Sweden in Paris

Svenska Skolan Paris (French: Ecole Suédoise de Paris) is a Swedish international school in the 17th arrondissement of Paris, France. It serves maternelle (preschool), primaire (primary), collège (junior high school), and lycée (senior high school).

The school was founded in 1879. It is the oldest of the Swedish schools established in other countries and was originally built close to Gare du Nord. A Swedish school had become necessary after hundreds of Swedish carpenters had moved to Paris in the latter half of the 19th century. It moved to rue Médéric, next to the Church of Sweden in Paris, in the early 1900s. Most of the students are children of Swedish citizens working for Swedish companies in France.

Roughly 100 students study at the school, mainly primary school students but since the year 2000 it also houses secondary school students. It is also possible to choose to study at the school for Swedish students who have their families in Sweden; the school will place these students with a host family.

In the 1990s, the school went through an internationalization, putting more emphasis on English.

== See also ==
- Lycée Français de Stockholm – French international school in Sweden
