= Sainte-Marie des Batignolles =

19th-century Roman Catholic chapel in Paris, France

Coordinates: 48.8868°N 2.3179°E

Sainte-Marie des Batignolles, Paris
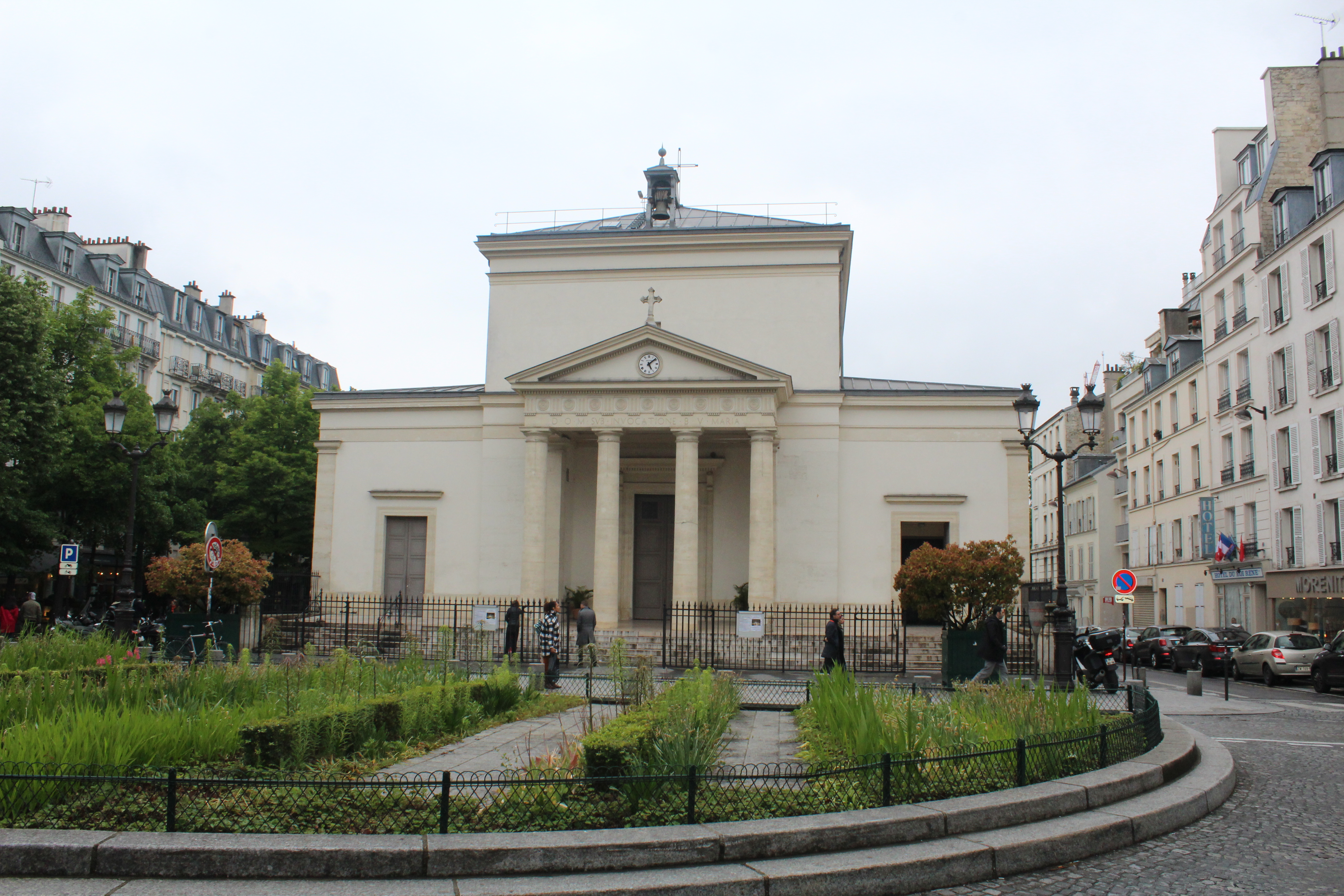
- Sainte- Marie de Batignolles

Religion
- Affiliation: Catholic Church
- Province: Archdiocese of Paris
- Rite: Roman Rite

Location
- Location: 17th arrondissement of Paris
- Interactive map of Sainte-Marie des Batignolles, Paris

Architecture
- Style: Neo-Classical
- Groundbreaking: 1826
- Completed: 1851

Sainte-Marie des Batignolles is a Roman Catholic church, modelled after a classical temple, located in the Batignolles quarter of the 17th arrondissement of Paris. While the exterior of the church is very plain, the interior features lavish 19th century sculptures, carving, stained glass and decoration.

== History ==
A small chapel was built in Batignolles, a rapidly growing community just outside the limits of the city of Paris, between 1826 and 1829, funded by contributions from King Charles X of France and the Duchess of Angoulême. At the time the community had a population of five thousand persons. As the neighborhood grew, a bigger chapel was soon needed. It was designed by architect Paul-Eugene Lequeux (1804–1873), who added new outside aisles and a new transept and choir to the original chapel. The new building was inspired by ancient Roman architecture, with a porch resembling an ancient Greek temple. It was finished in 1851. In 1856, the whole community of Batignolles-Monceau was annexed to the city of Paris.

== Exterior ==
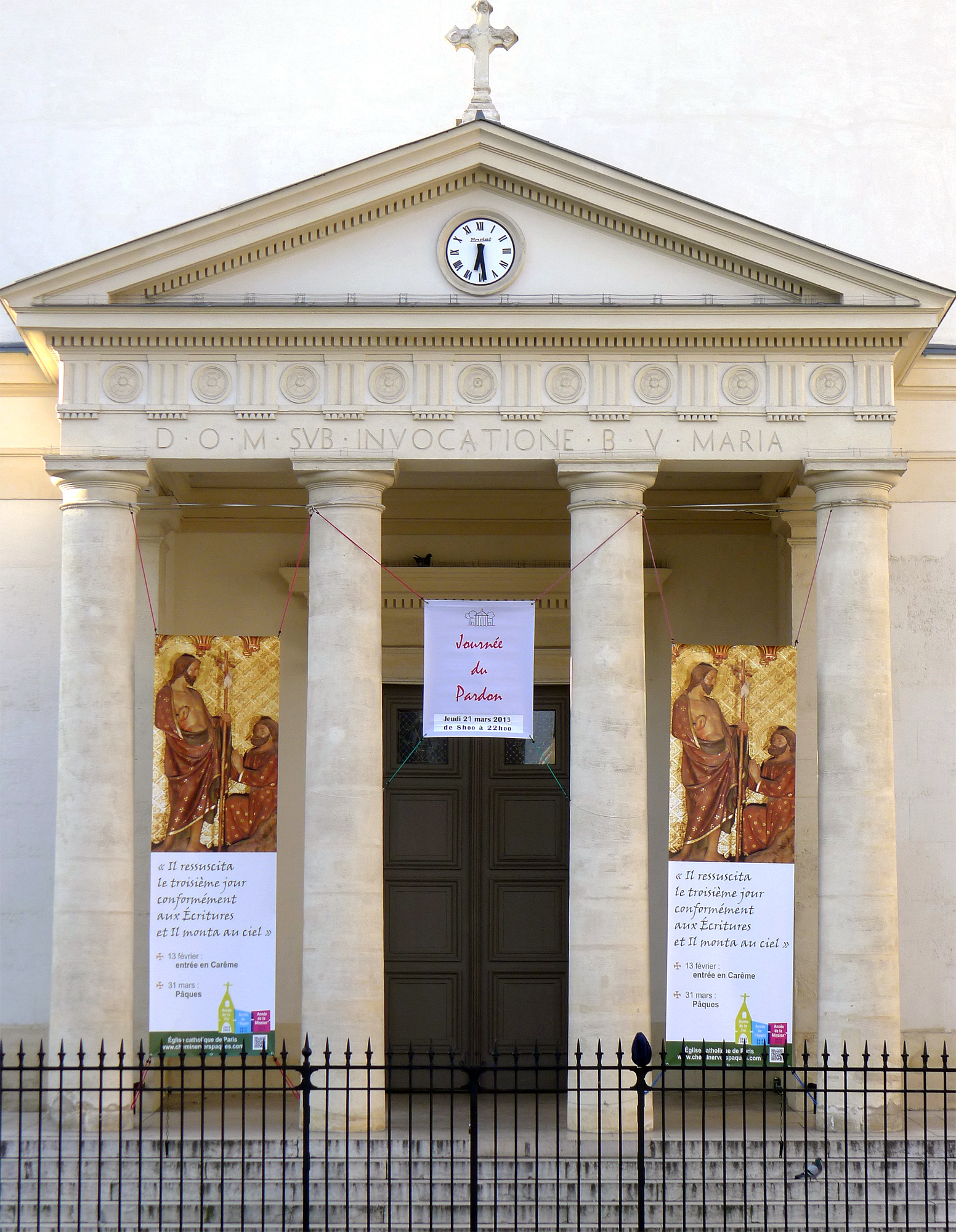
The Fronton with columns

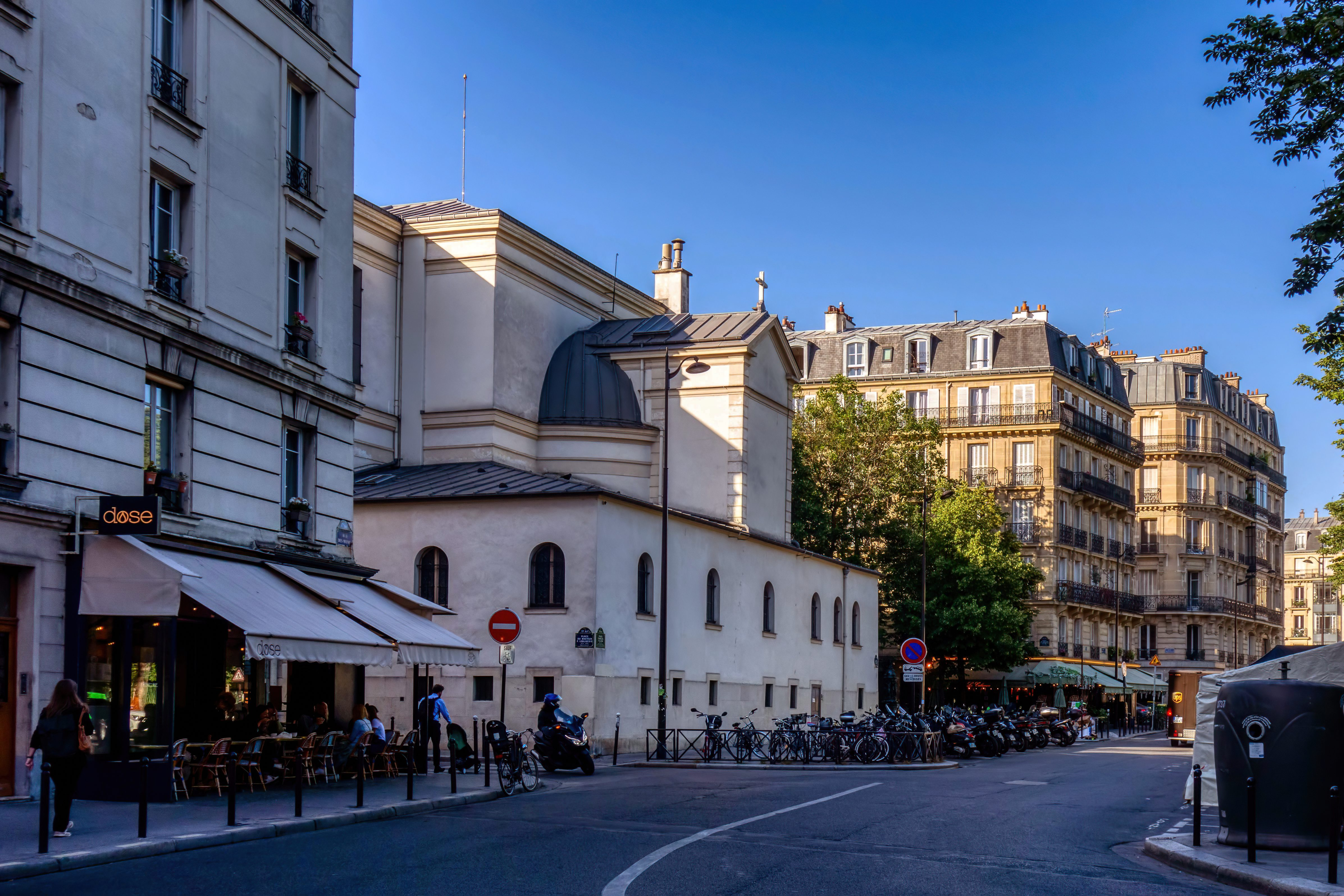
Back of the church

The neo-classical exterior is very sober, with plain Doric columns and a fronton without decoration. It is one of the few Paris churches without a bell tower; the bells are placed on the roof. The church looks out onto the extensive Batignolles Garden in the 17th arrondissement.

== Interior ==
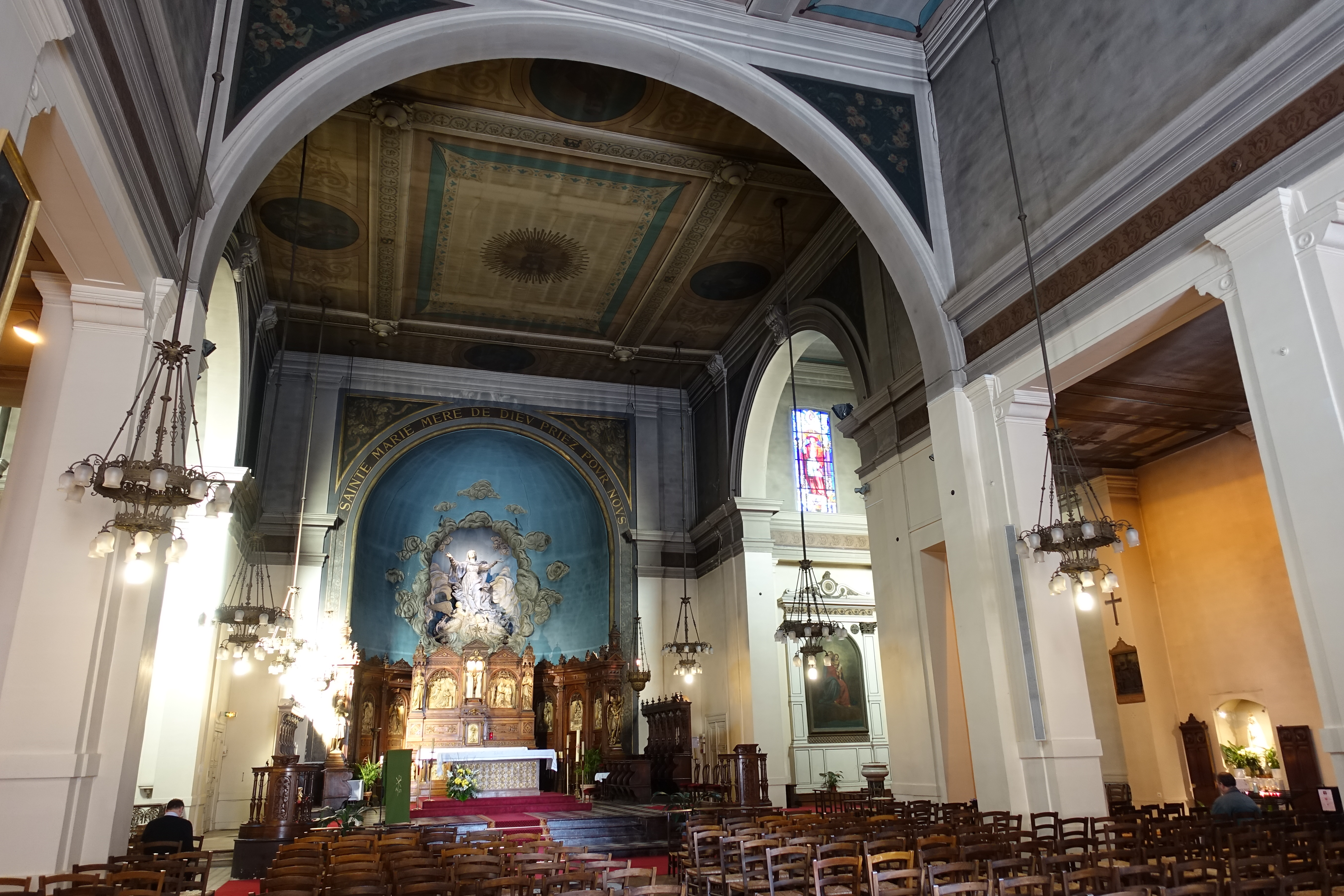
The Choir

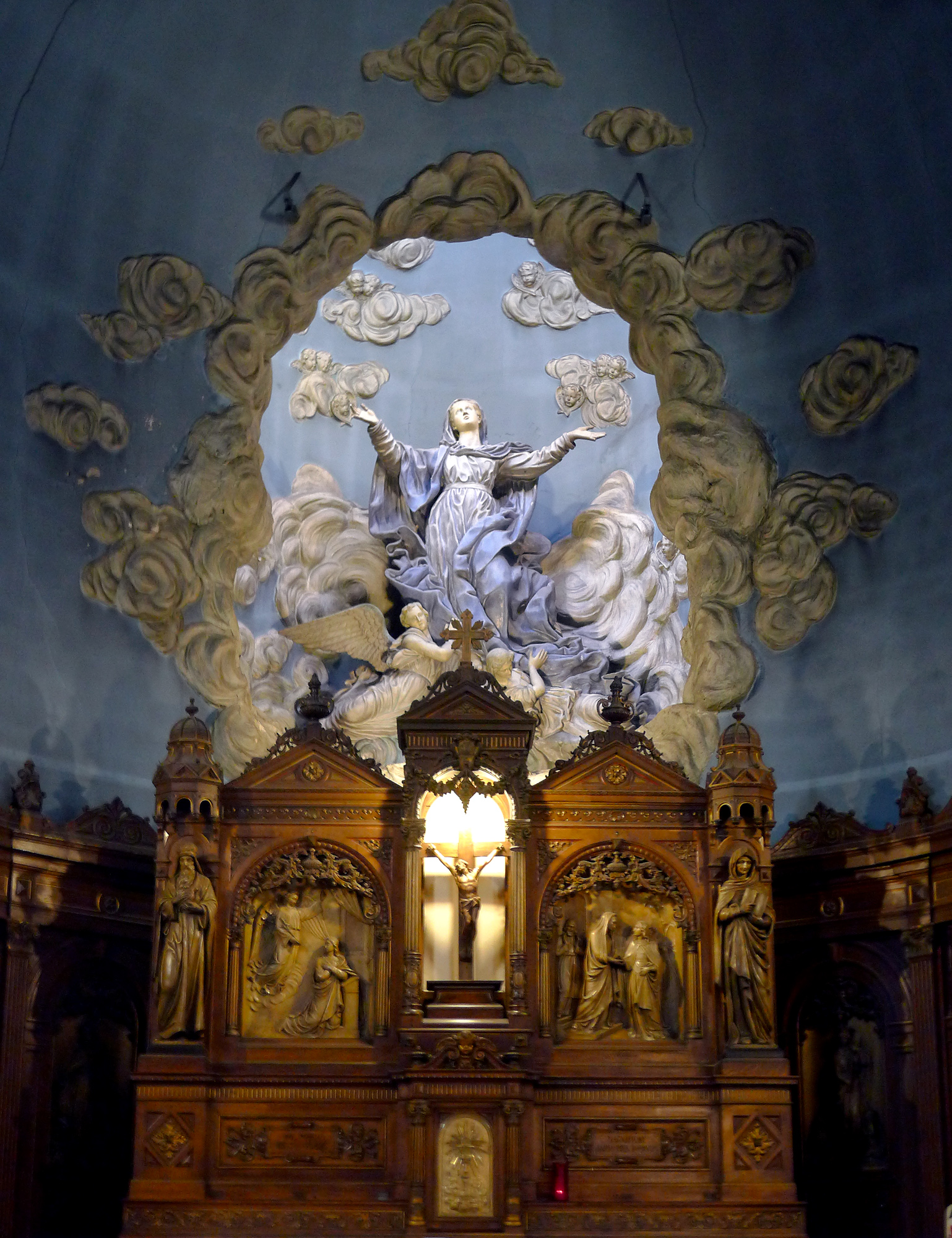
Sculpture of the ascent to heaven of the Virgin Mary

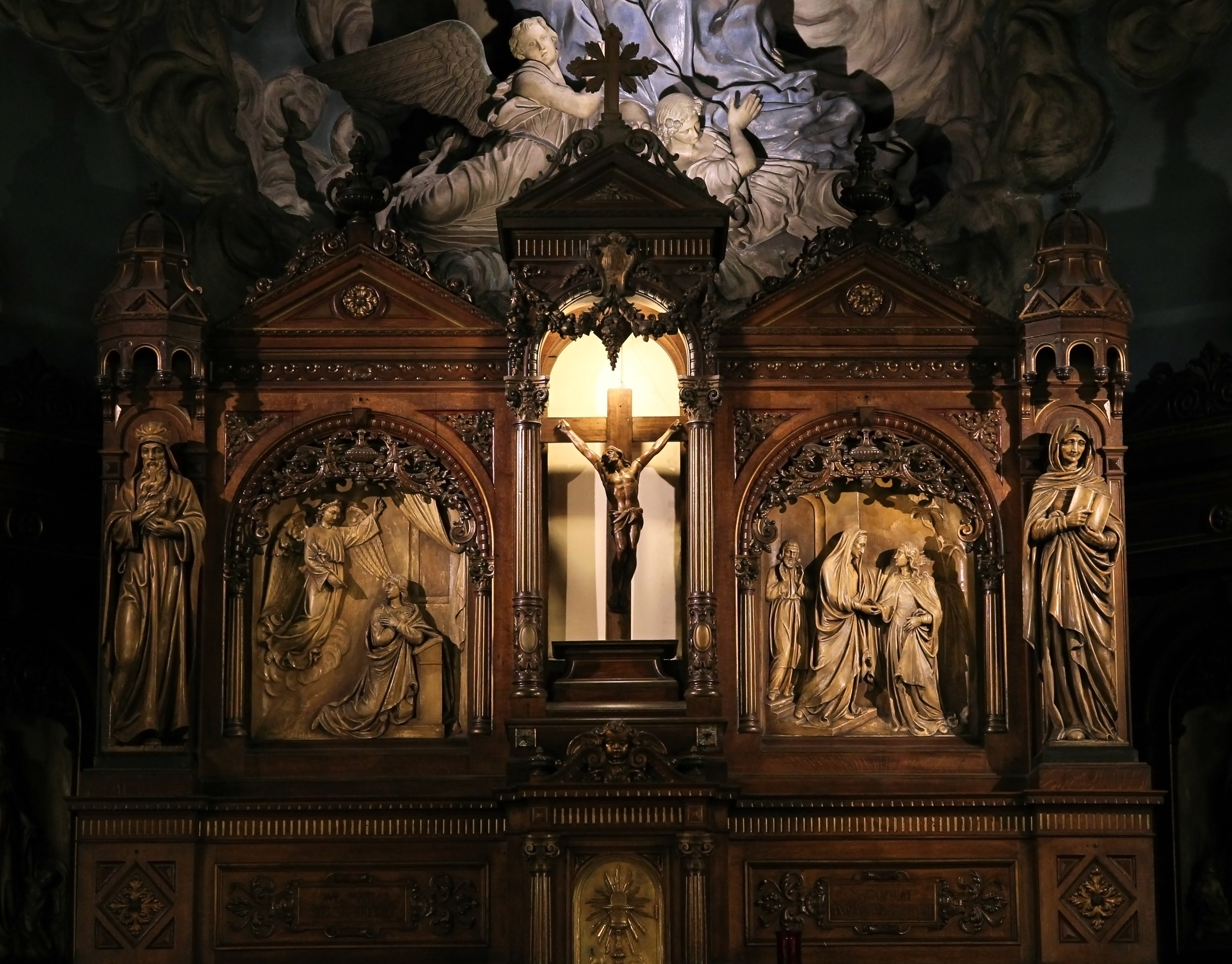
The carved retable with scenes from the life of Saint Mary

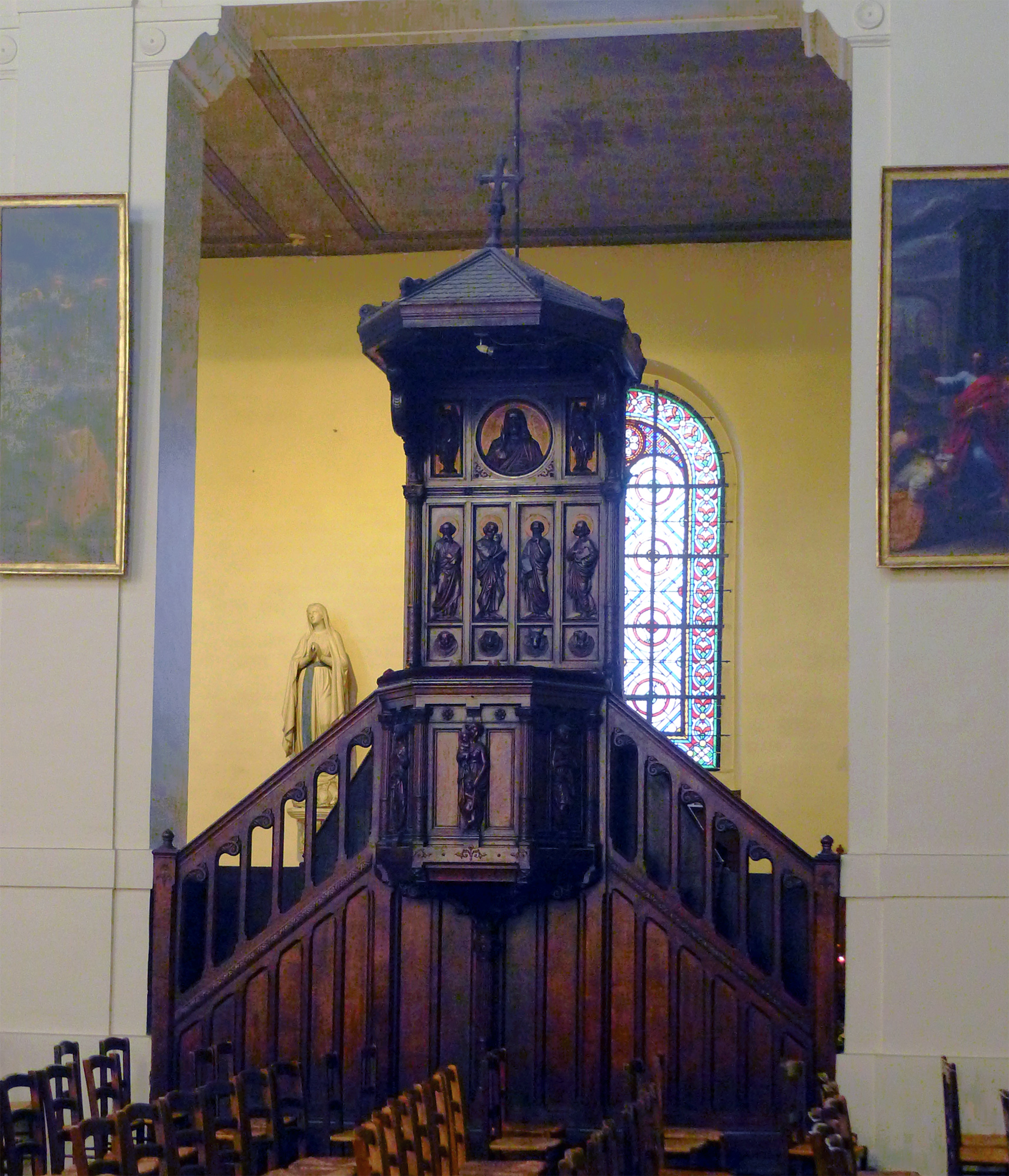
The pulpit

While the exterior is sober neoclassical, the interior features an abundance of 19th century color and decoration. The centerpiece is a statue of the Assumption of the Virgin, with the figure of the Virgin Mary with angels floating above the Choir, and an immense retable with sculpture of carved oak, depicting scenes from the life of the Virgin.

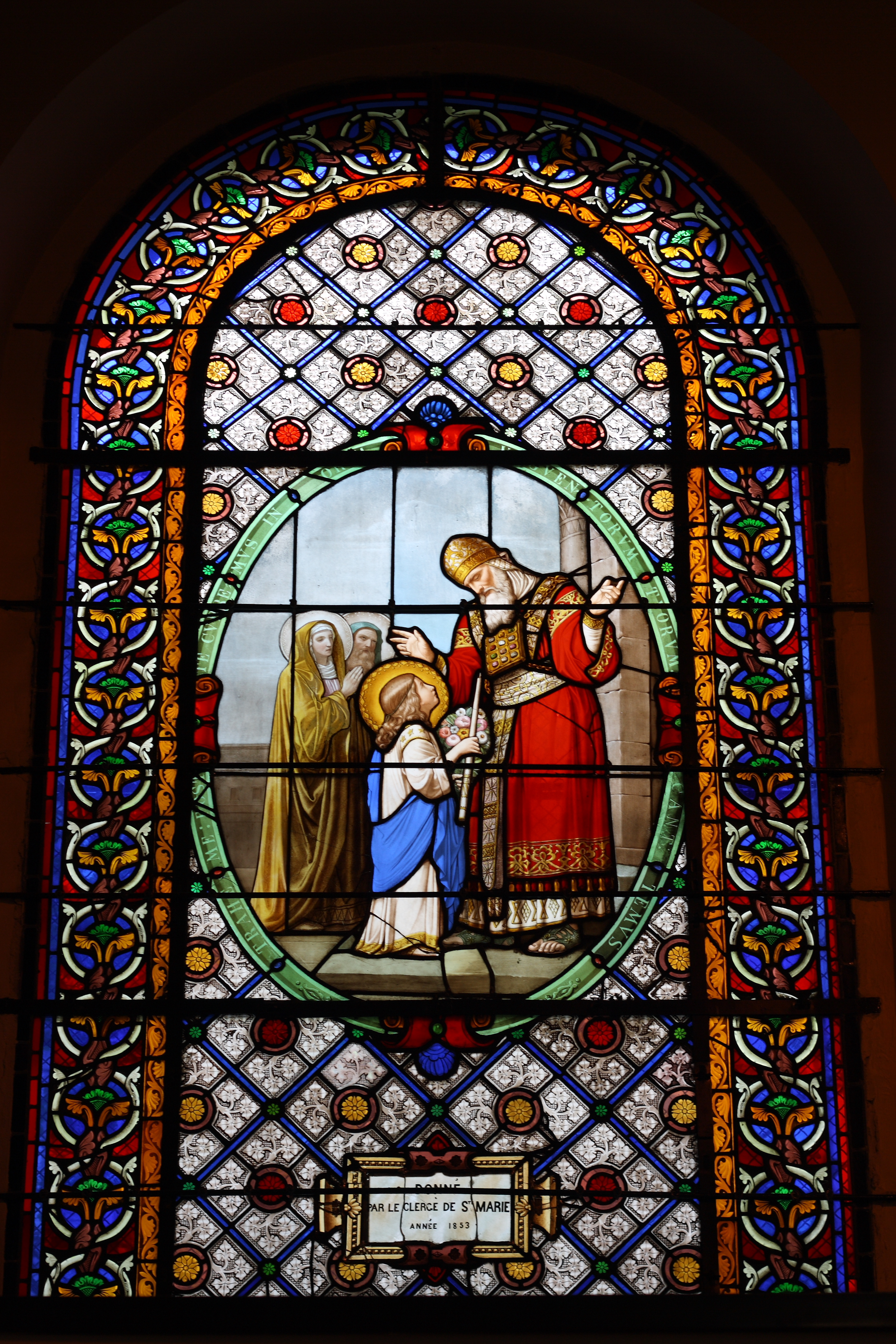
"Presentation of Mary in the Temple" by Emile Thibaut (1853)

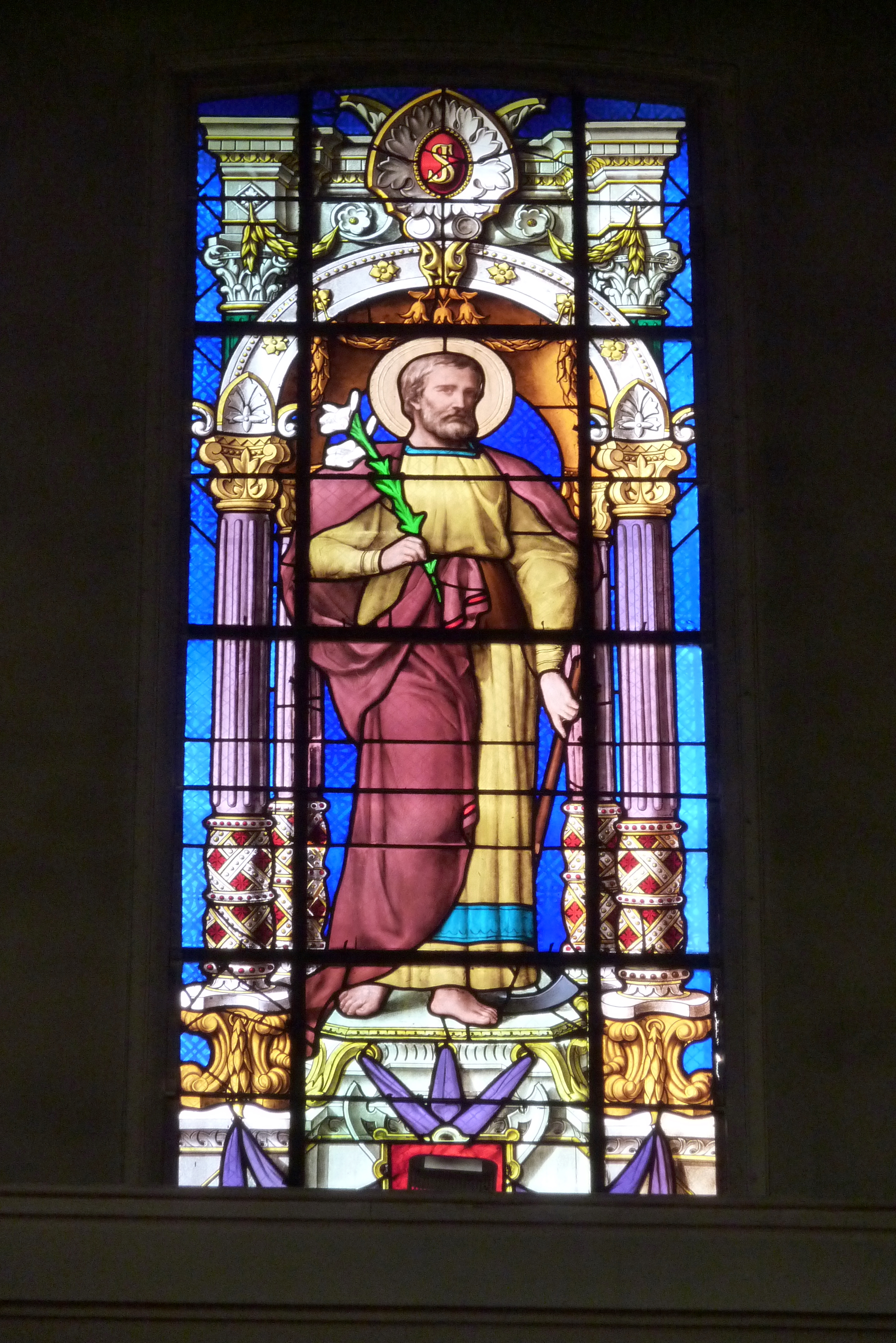
Saint Joseph by Thibaut

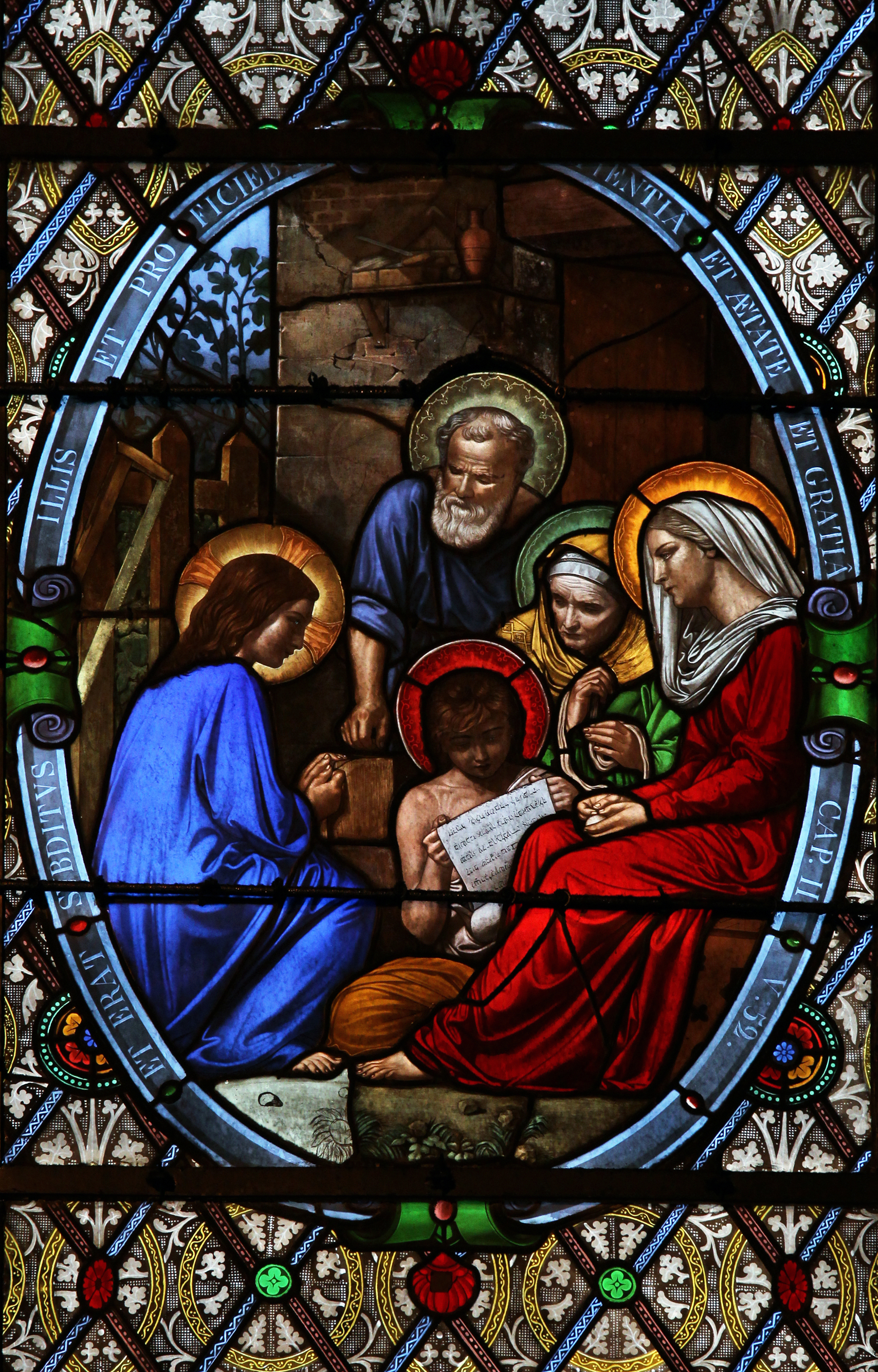
"The Holy Family" by Thibaut

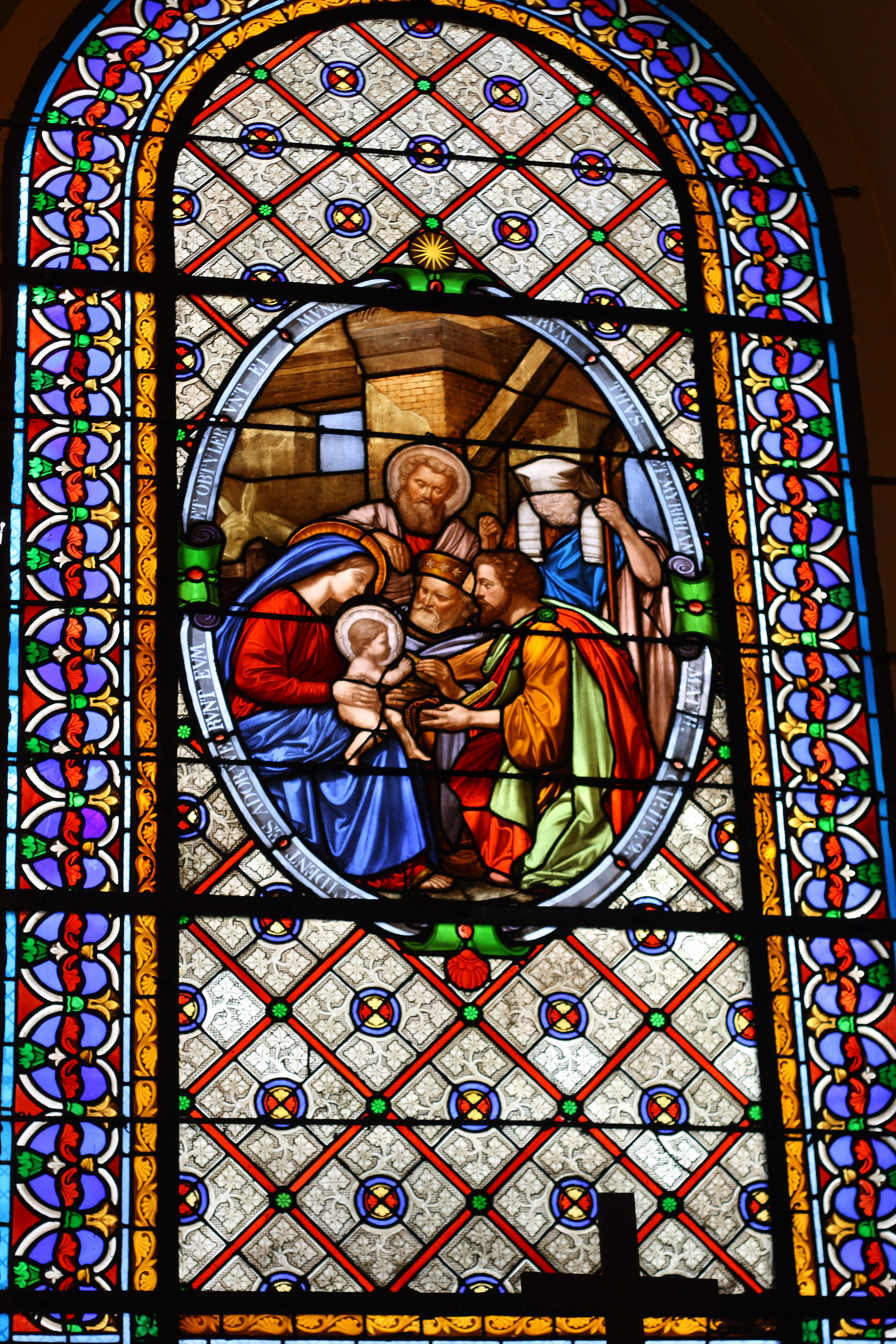
The Infant Christ with the Three Kings, by Emile Thibaut

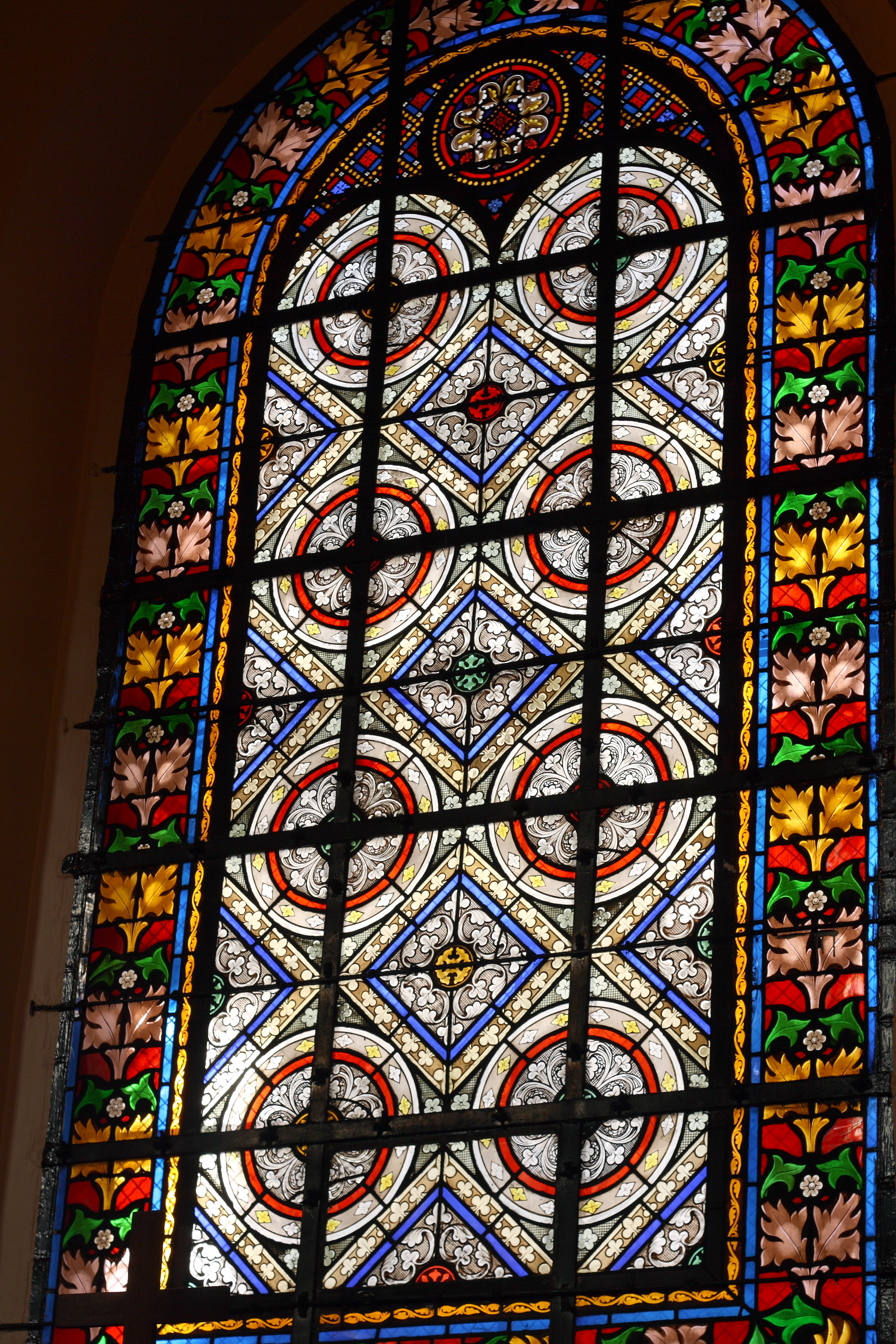
A decorative window

The colorful and realistic stained glass art in the choir is the work of Emile Thibaut (1853).

=== Organ ===
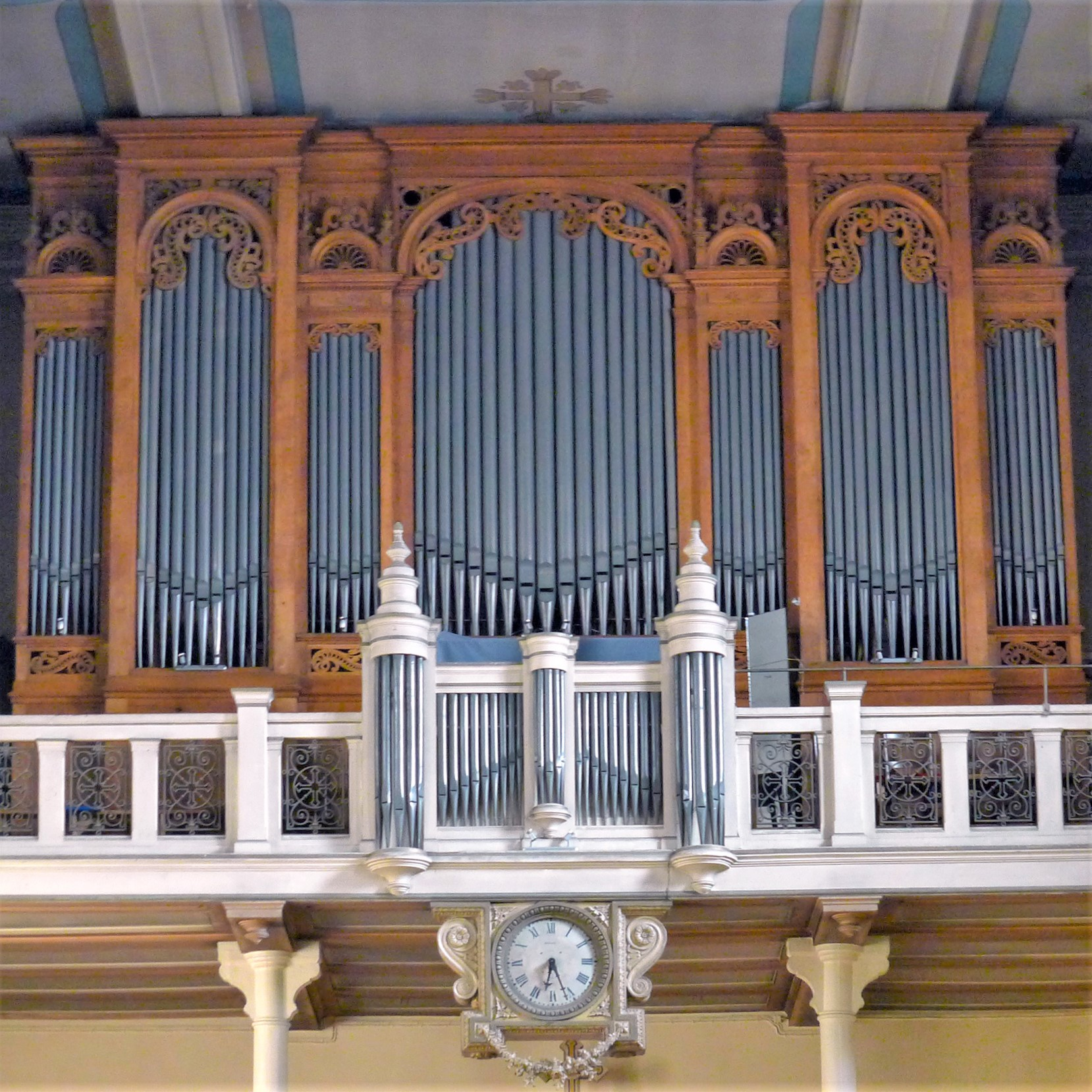

The organ of the church, located in the tribune over the portal to the nave, was built by Mutin (1923).
