= Church of Saint-Francois de Sales, Paris =

Churches in Paris, France

Coordinates: 48.8847°N 2.3050°E

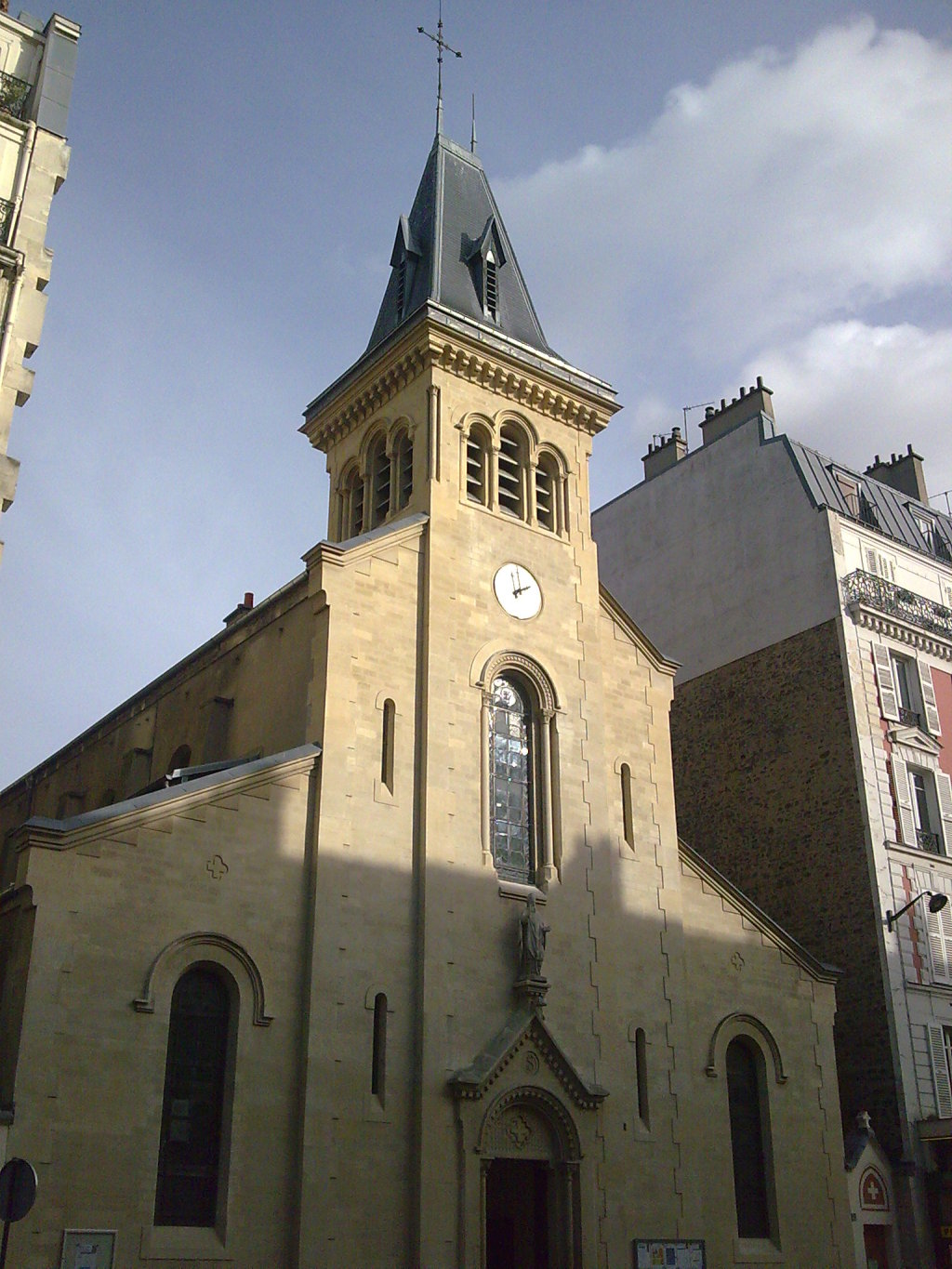
The old church of Saint Francois de Sales

The Parish Church of Saint-Francois-de-Sales in the 17th arrondissement of Paris is actually two churches, linked by a long passageway. The old church was built in 1873, and when it proved to be too small for the rapidly-growing neighborhood, the new church was built between 1911 and 1913 close by on Rue Ampere.

They both take their name from Saint Francis de Sales, the theologian and Bishop of Geneva in the 17th century, who was canonized in 1665. Sales was an influential scholar whose work greatly affected the French Counter-Reformation. He strongly advocated lavish interior decoration, stained glass windows and abundant art to combat the austerity of the Protestant churches.

== Old church ==
When the old church was begun in the Plaine-de-Monceaux quarter it was in the countryside surrounded by fields. The neighborhood was urbanized in the 1860s by Napoleon III. The architect of the old church was Edourard Delebarre Debay (1836–1891) It was consecrated on 30 October 1873.

The entry of the old church is at rue Bremonter.he old church features particularly fine stained glass windows from the workshop of Henri Chabin. The apse chapels are also colorfully painted and contain sculpture of the period.

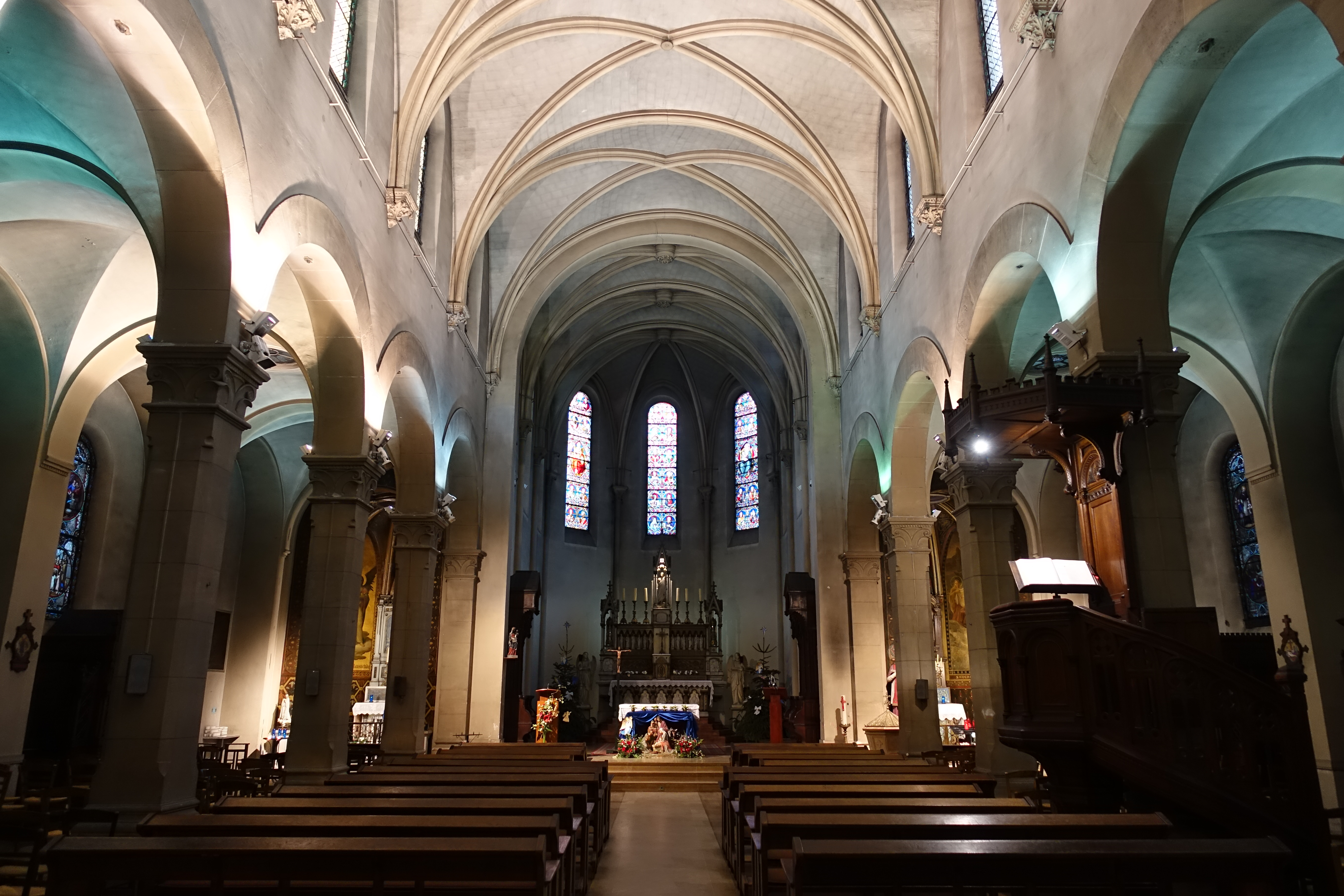
The nave, facing the choir

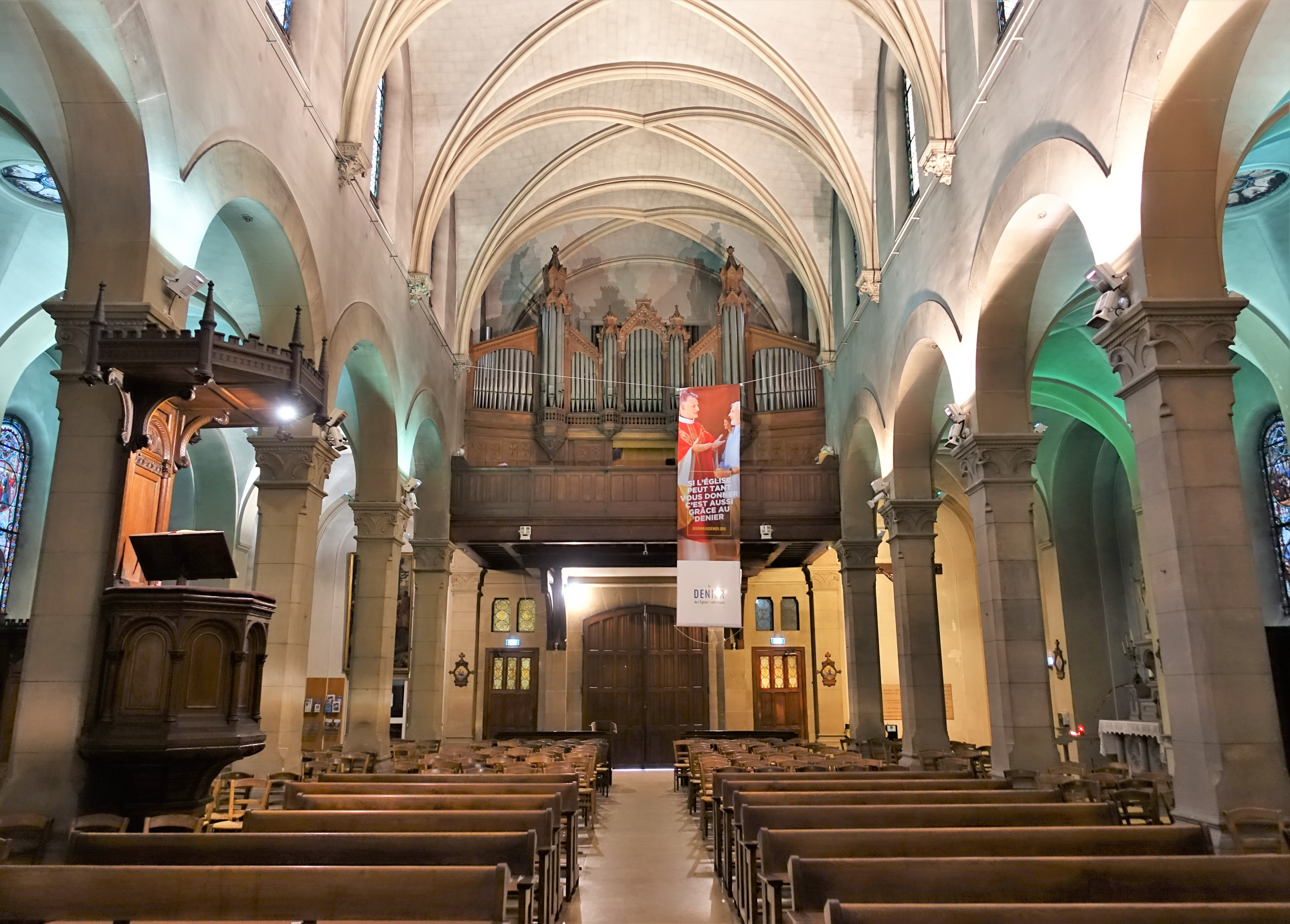
View toward the tribune and organ

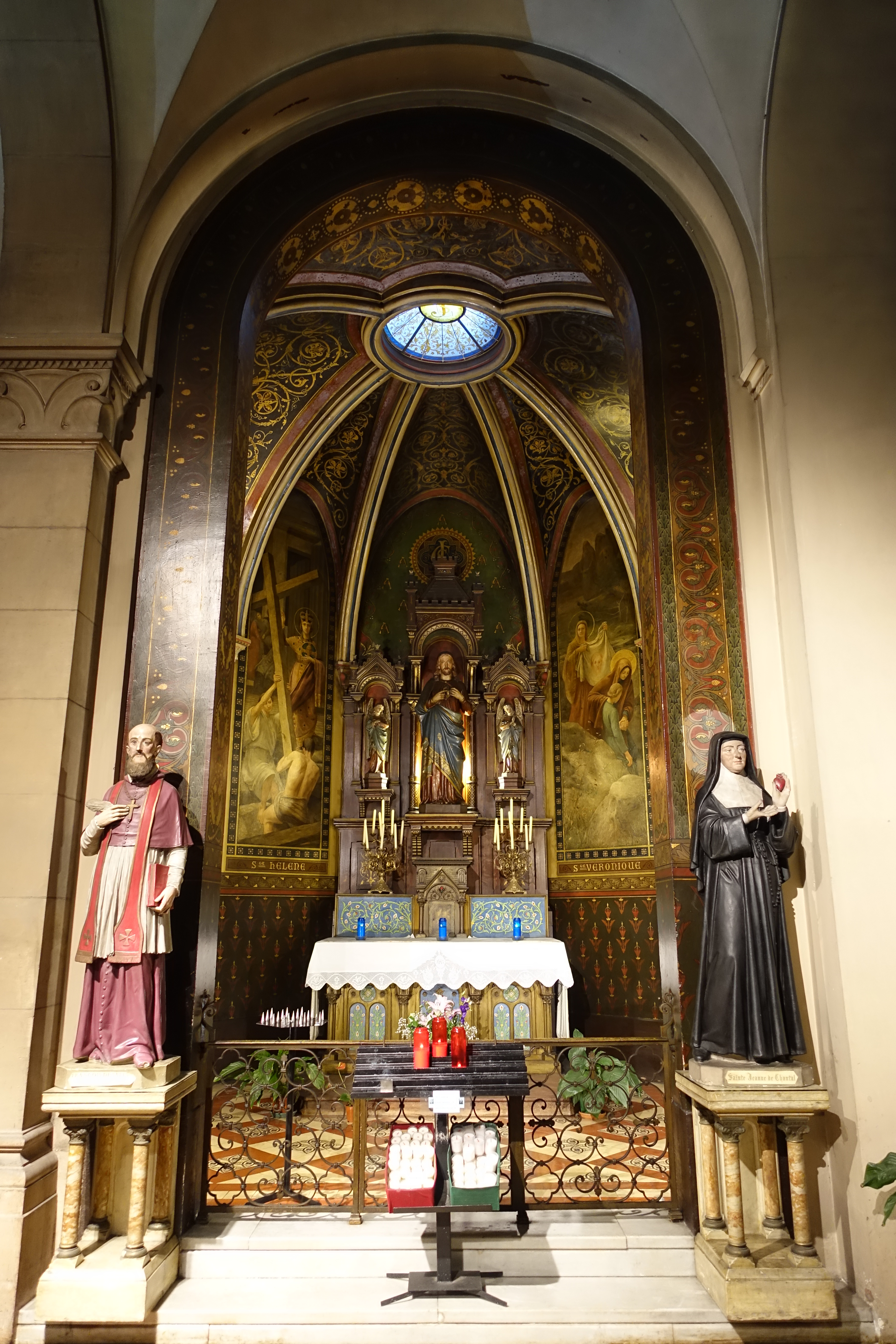
Chapel of the Sacred Heart

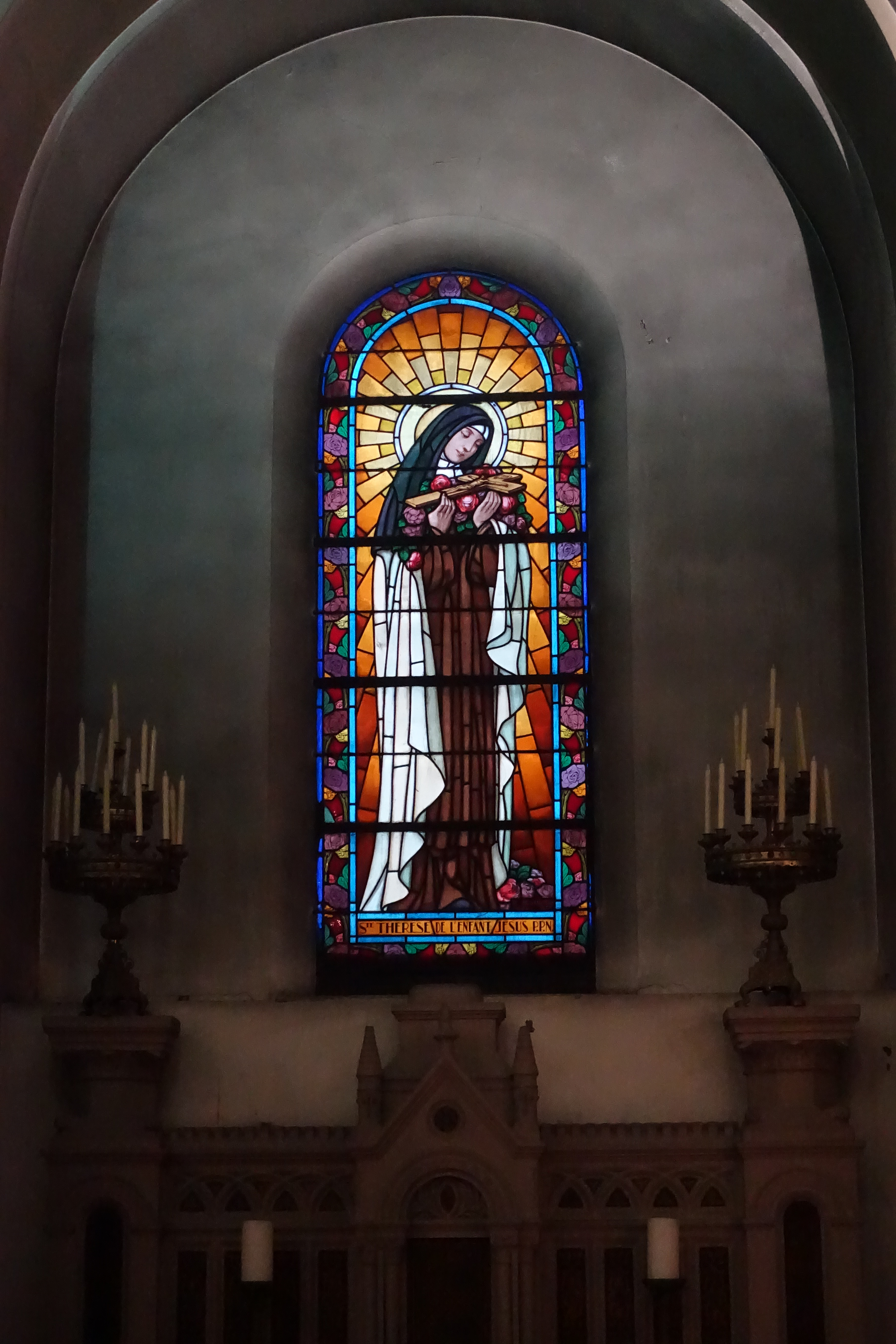
Stained glass - the Virgin Mary

== New church ==
After the neighborhood was annexed by Paris, the population of the area grew rapidly. and a new church was needed. It is in the Romano-Byzantine style, very different from the old church, a very different style from the old church, but it also offers an array of colorful stained glass windows, along with a sculpture in oak of Christ revived by Jozef Pirz and a fresco in the Chapel of Saint Francis by Frederic Montenard.

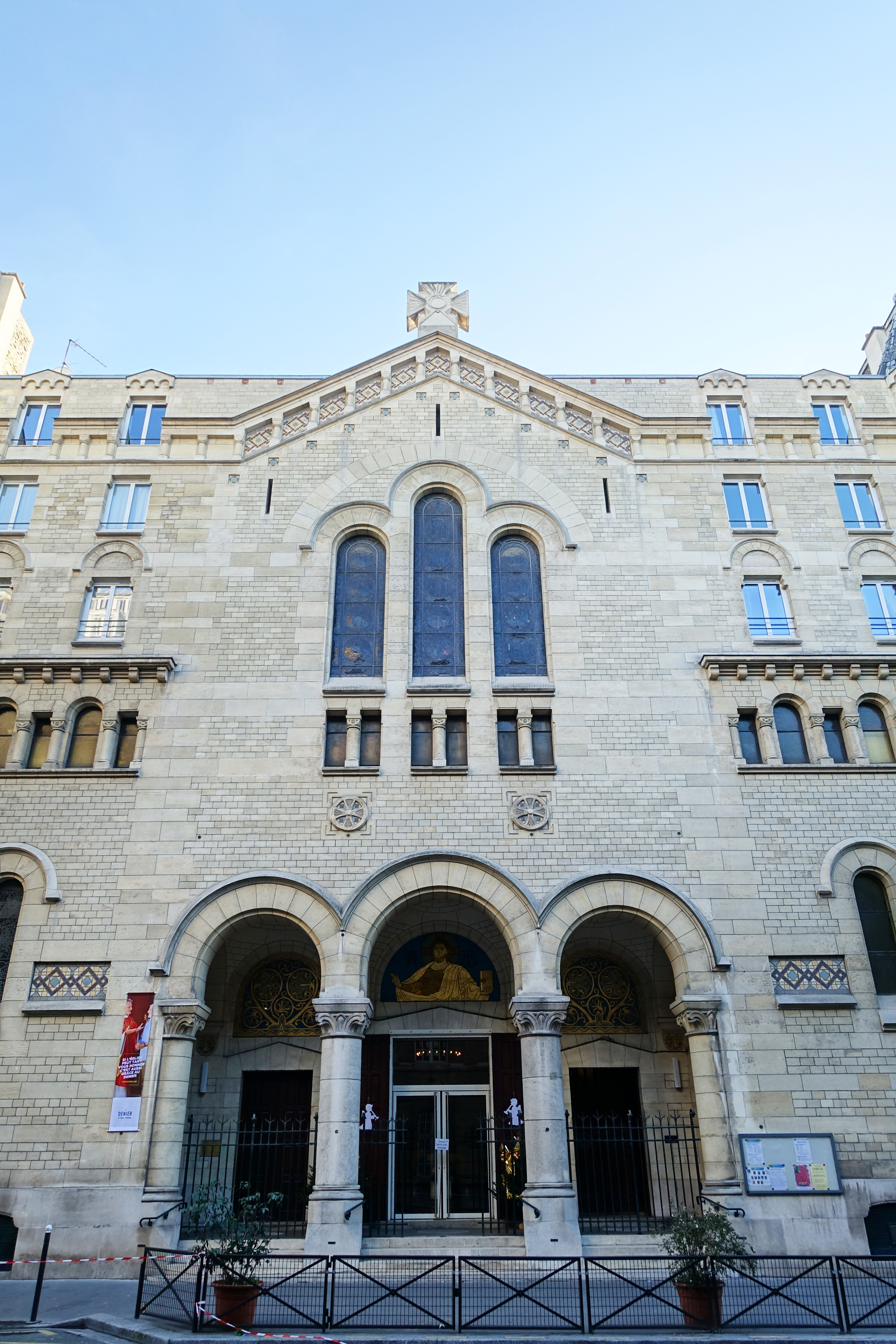
The facade of new church

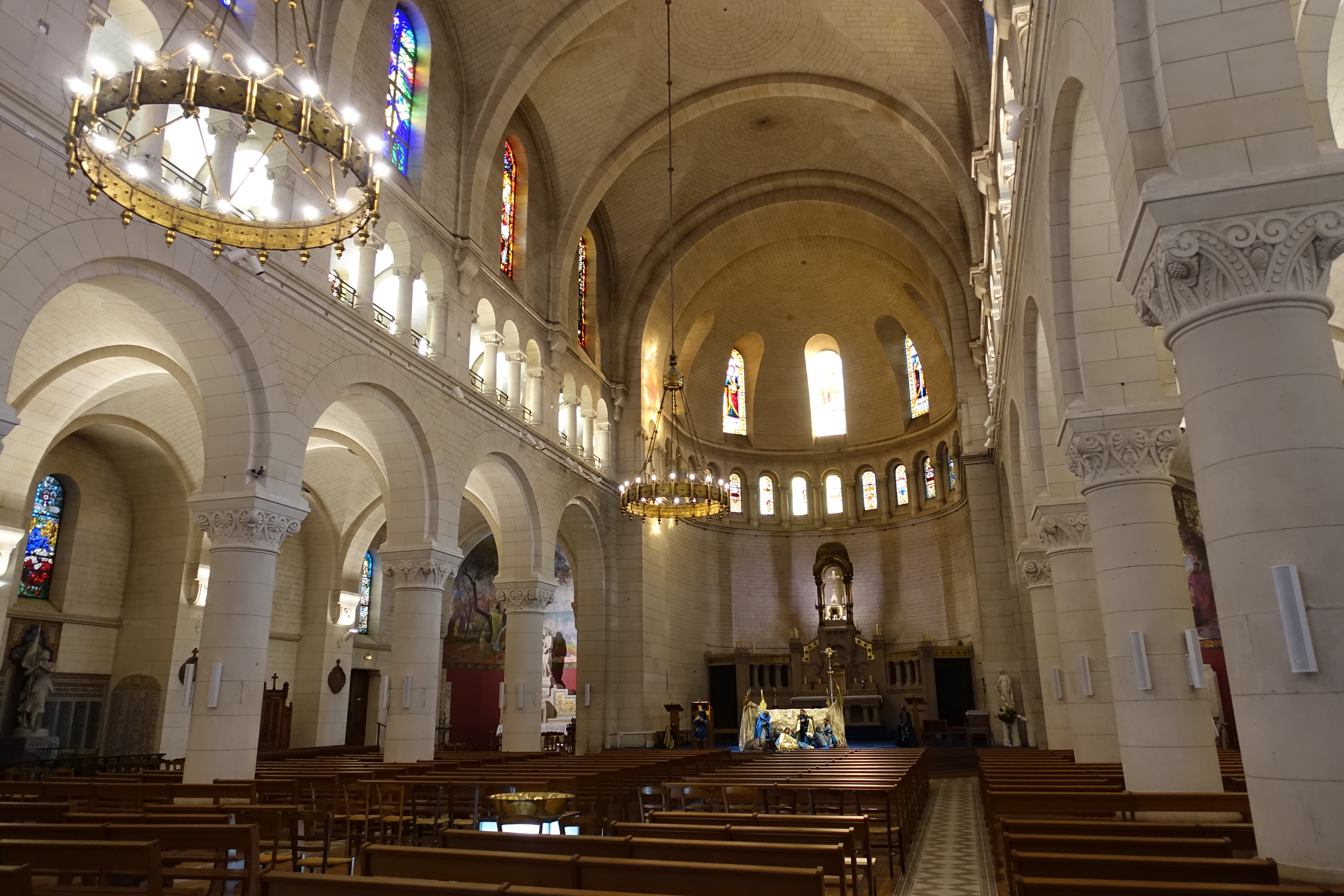
Nave of the new church on Rue Ampere

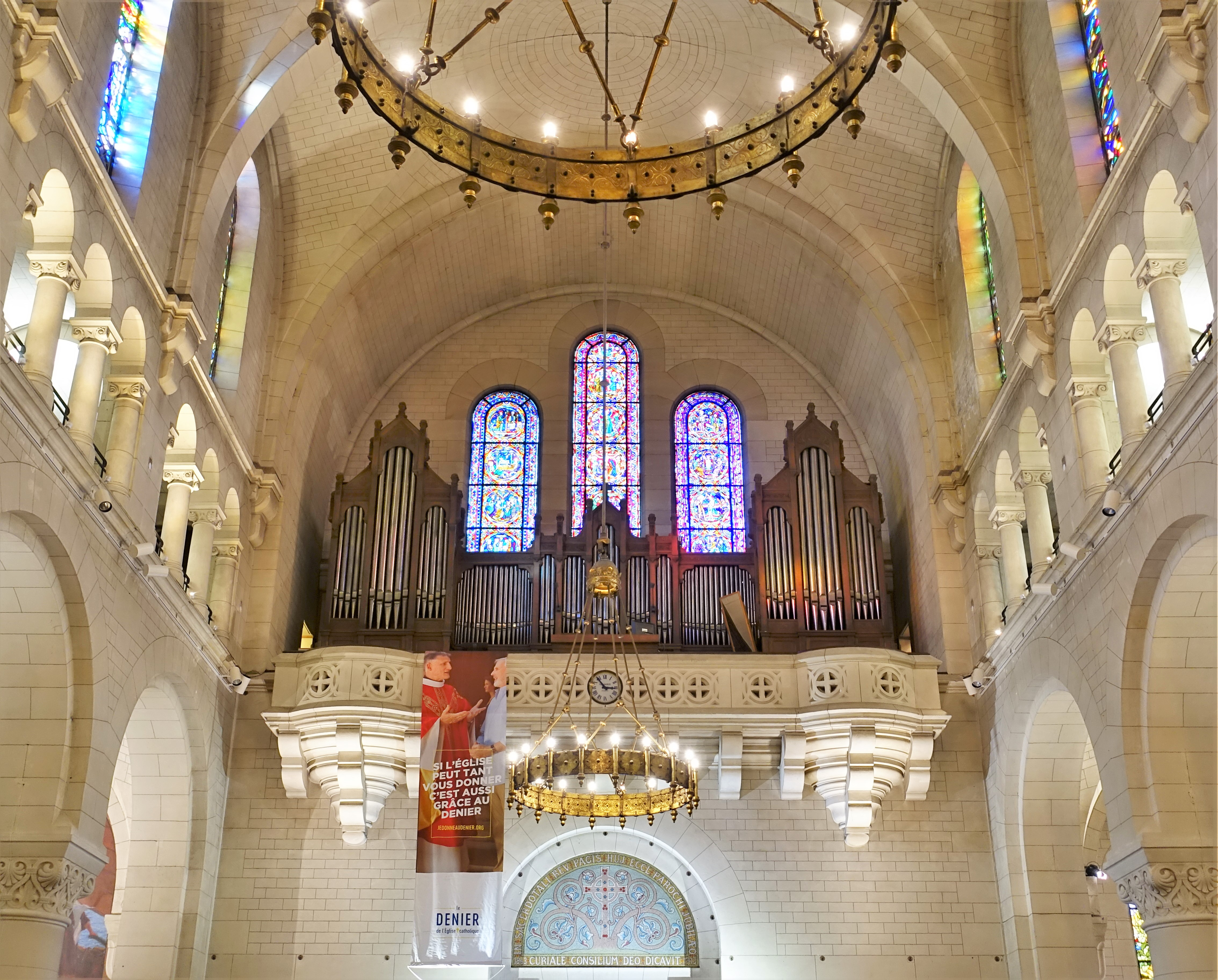
Tribune and organ of the new church

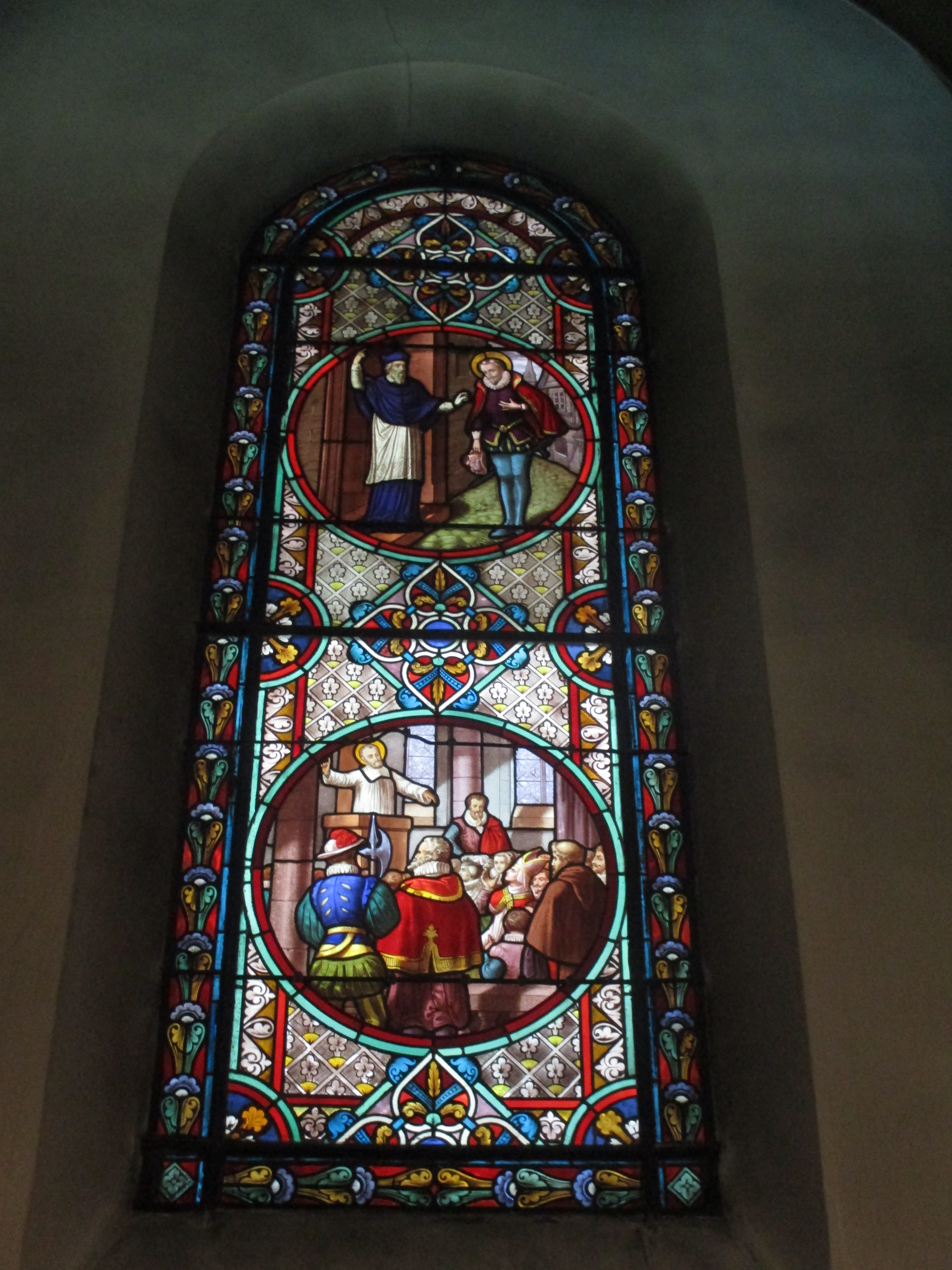
Window depicting Saint Francois de Sales preaching
