= 17th arrondissement of Paris =

- Municipal arrondissement
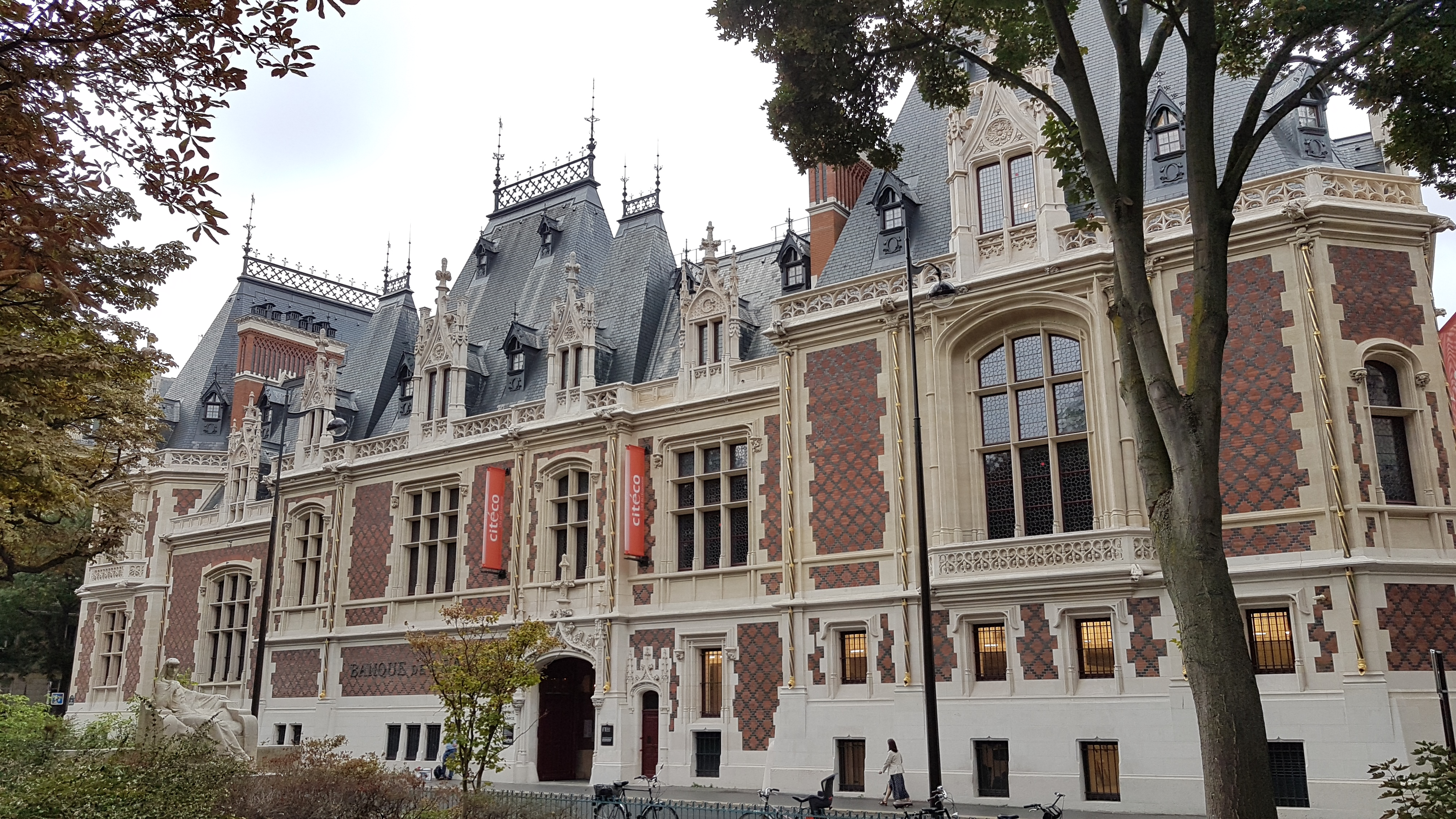
- The Hôtel Gaillard, an hôtel particulier, has housed the Cité de l'économie et de la monnaie since 2019.

- Coat of arms

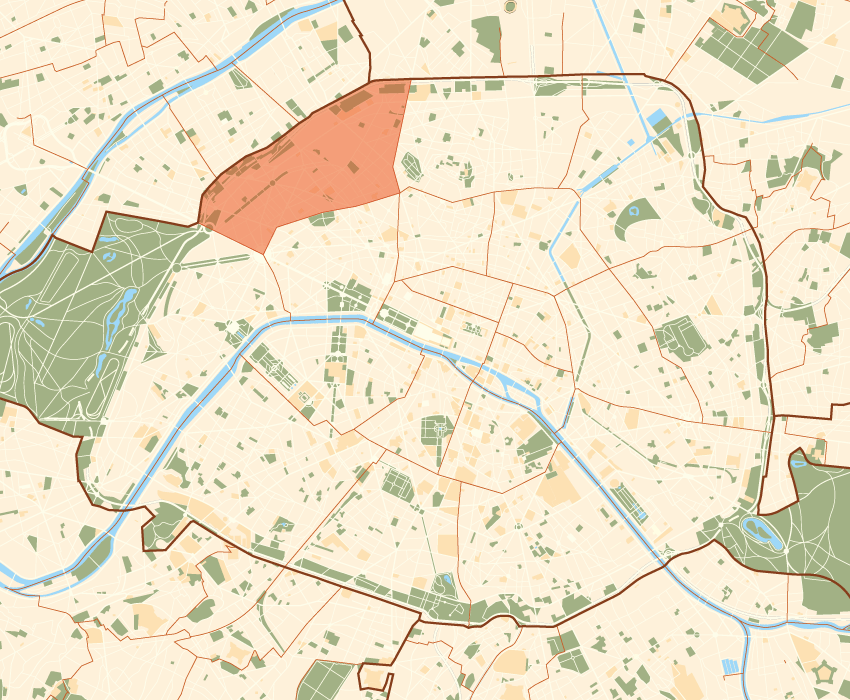
- Location within Paris
- Coordinates: 48°52′56″N 2°18′28″E
- Country: France
- Region: Île-de-France
- Department: Paris
- Commune: Paris

Government
  - Mayor (2026-2032): Geoffroy Boulard (LR)
- Area: 5.67 km^{2} (2.19 sq mi)
- Population (2023): 159,212
  - Density: 28,100/km^{2} (72,700/sq mi)
- INSEE code: 75117

The 17th arrondissement of Paris (XVII^{e} arrondissement) is one of the 20 arrondissements of the capital city of France. In spoken French, it is referred to as le dix-septième (pronounced [lə di sɛtjɛm]; "the seventeenth").

The arrondissement, known as Batignolles-Monceau, is situated on the right bank of the River Seine. In 2023, it had a population of 159,212. It borders the inner suburbs of Neuilly-sur-Seine, Levallois-Perret and Clichy in Hauts-de-Seine to the northwest, as well as Saint-Ouen-sur-Seine in Seine-Saint-Denis to the northeast.

== Geography ==
The quarters of the 17th arrondissement

The land area of the 17th arrondissement is 5.669 km^{2} (2.189 sq mi; 1,401 acres).

Situated on the right bank (Rive Droite) of the River Seine, it is divided into four administrative districts: Ternes and Monceau in the southwestern part, two upper-class districts which are more Haussmannian in style; in the middle of the arrondissement, the Batignolles district, an area mostly occupied by young families or couples, with a marked gentrification process; in the northeastern part, the Épinettes district, a former industrial district gone residential, which is mainly middle class and also experiencing a less advanced gentrification process.

The town hall of the 17th arrondissement is on the Rue des Batignolles. It is the only town hall of Paris to be located in a modern building. The original building was torn down in 1971 to make room for the current edifice. The 17th arrondissement also hosts the Palais des Congrès of Paris, a large exhibition centre with an associated high-rise hotel, the Hyatt Regency Paris Étoile, the largest in the city.

The arrondissement consists of four quarters:

- Quartier Ternes (65)
- Quartier Plaine-de-Monceaux (66)
- Quartier Batignolles (67)
- Quartier Épinettes (68)

== Demographics ==
The peak population of Paris's 17th arrondissement was reached in 1954, when it had 231,987 inhabitants. Today, the arrondissement remains dense in population and business activity, with 92,267 jobs as of the 1999 census.

=== Historical population ===
Historical population

Year	Pop.	±% p.a.
1861	75,228	—
1872	101,804	+2.79%
1881	144,350	+3.96%
1891	175,742	+1.99%
1901	206,208	+1.61%
1911	215,832	+0.46%
1921	220,965	+0.24%
1931	220,716	−0.01%
1936	221,260	+0.05%
1946	218,341	−0.13%
1954	231,987	+0.76%

Year	Pop.	±% p.a.
1962	227,687	−0.23%
1968	210,299	−1.32%
1975	186,293	−1.72%
1982	169,513	−1.34%
1990	161,935	−0.57%
1999	160,860	−0.07%
2007	164,673	+0.29%
2012	170,156	+0.66%
2017	167,288	−0.34%
2023	159,212	−0.82%

Source: Demographia (1861-1999) and INSEE (1876-2023)

=== Immigration ===
Place of birth of residents of the 17th arrondissement in 1999
Born in metropolitan France	Born outside metropolitan France			
77.7%	22.3%			
77.7%	Born in overseas France	Born in foreign countries with French citizenship at birth^{1}	EU-15 immigrants^{2}	Non-EU-15 immigrants
77.7%	1.1%	4.6%	5.1%	11.5%
^{1} This group is made up largely of former French settlers, such as pieds-noirs in Northwest Africa, followed by former colonial citizens who had French citizenship at birth (such as was often the case for the native elite in French colonies), as well as to a lesser extent foreign-born children of French expatriates. A foreign country is understood as a country not part of France in 1999, so a person born for example in 1950 in Algeria, when Algeria was an integral part of France, is nonetheless listed as a person born in a foreign country in French statistics.^{2} An immigrant is a person born in a foreign country not having French citizenship at birth. An immigrant may have acquired French citizenship since moving to France, but is still considered an immigrant in French statistics. On the other hand, persons born in France with foreign citizenship (the children of immigrants) are not listed as immigrants.

== Economy ==
The southwestern part of the arrondissement is very dense in offices, mostly for services. Several large companies have their headquarters there. The head office of Dailymotion is located in the Immeuble Horizons 17. When it existed, Gaz de France had its head office in the 17th arrondissement.

Batignolles and Épinettes, two former industrial areas, are now mostly residential. The area around the Avenue de Clichy, shared with the 8th, 9th and 18th arrondissements, is occupied by a great variety of shops, making it the third-largest avenue of Paris in terms of sales.

== Places of interest ==
- Arc de Triomphe (partial)
- Marché des Batignolles
- Marché Poncelet
- Rue de Levis
- Musée national Jean-Jacques Henner
- Palais des Congrès and Hôtel Concorde Lafayette
- Square des Batignolles
- Cité des Fleurs
- Place de Clichy
- Parc Clichy-Batignolles
- Square des Épinettes
- Notre-Dame-de-la-Compassion, Paris (former royal chapel with stained glass designed by Ingres)
- Sainte-Odile, Paris, an Art Deco church with the tallest bell-tower in Paris
- Church of Saint-Ferdinand des Ternes, Paris
- Church of Saint-Francois de Sales, Paris
- Saint-Michel des Batignolles
- Sainte-Marie des Batignolles
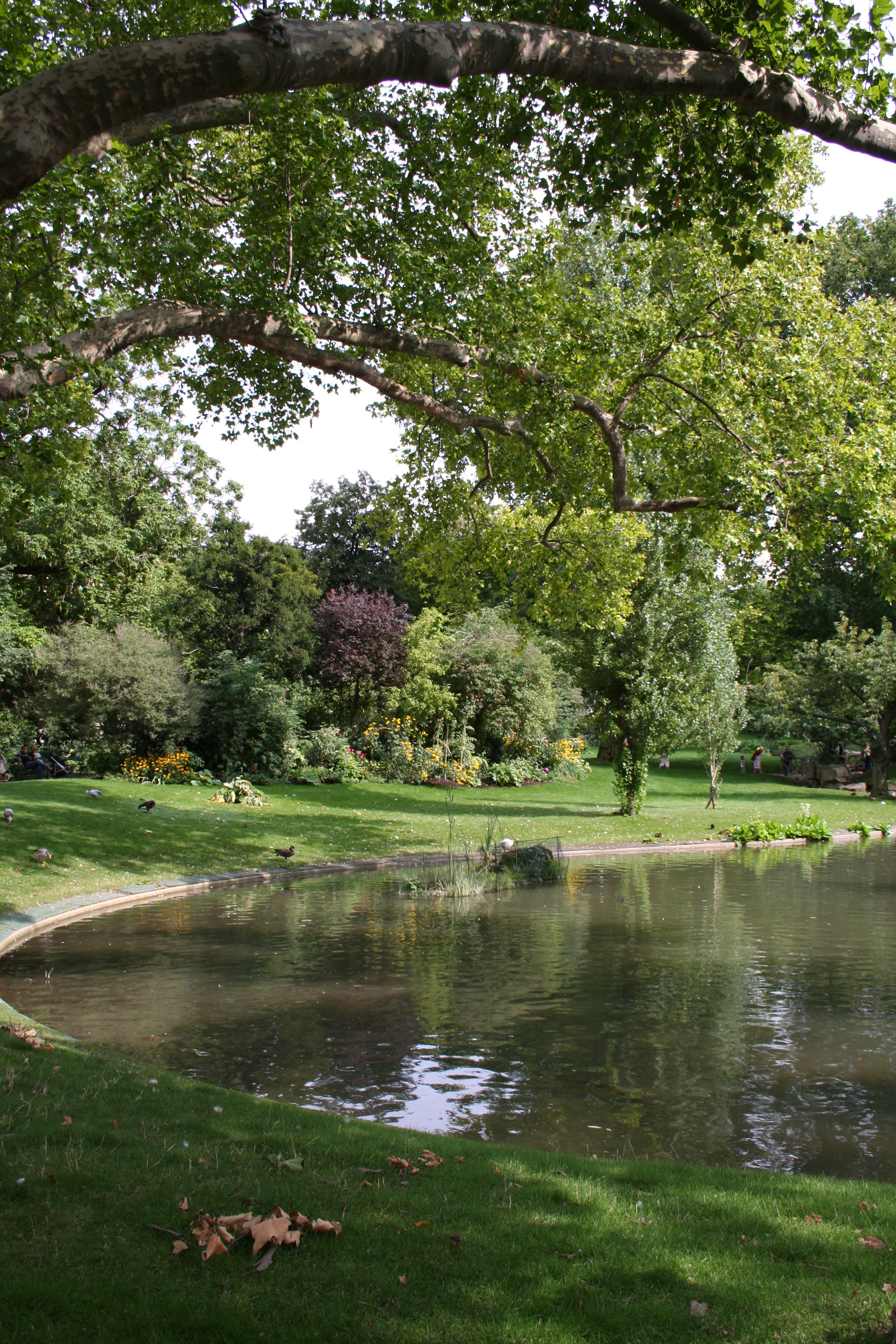
Square des Épinettes

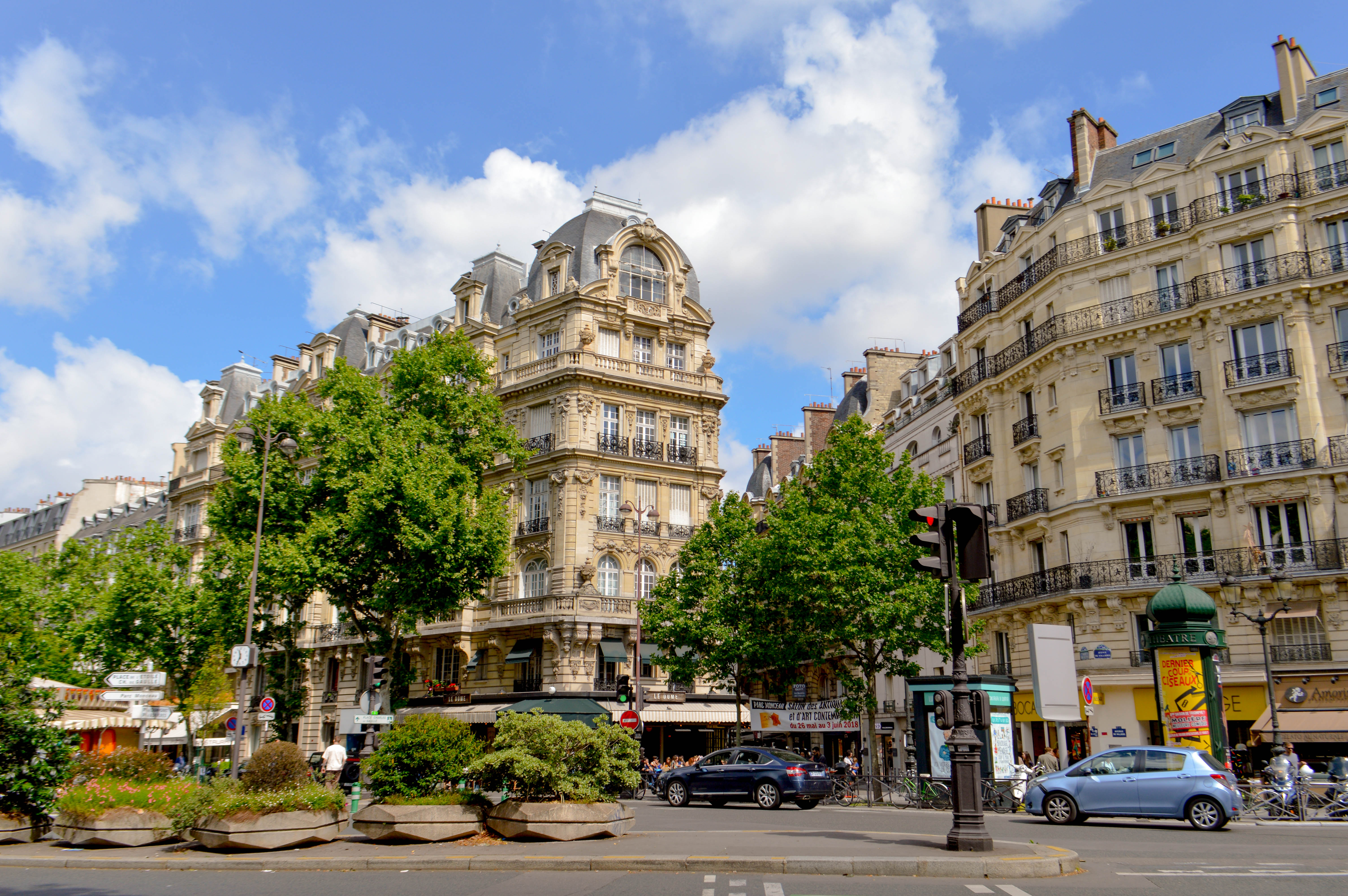
Avenue de Villiers

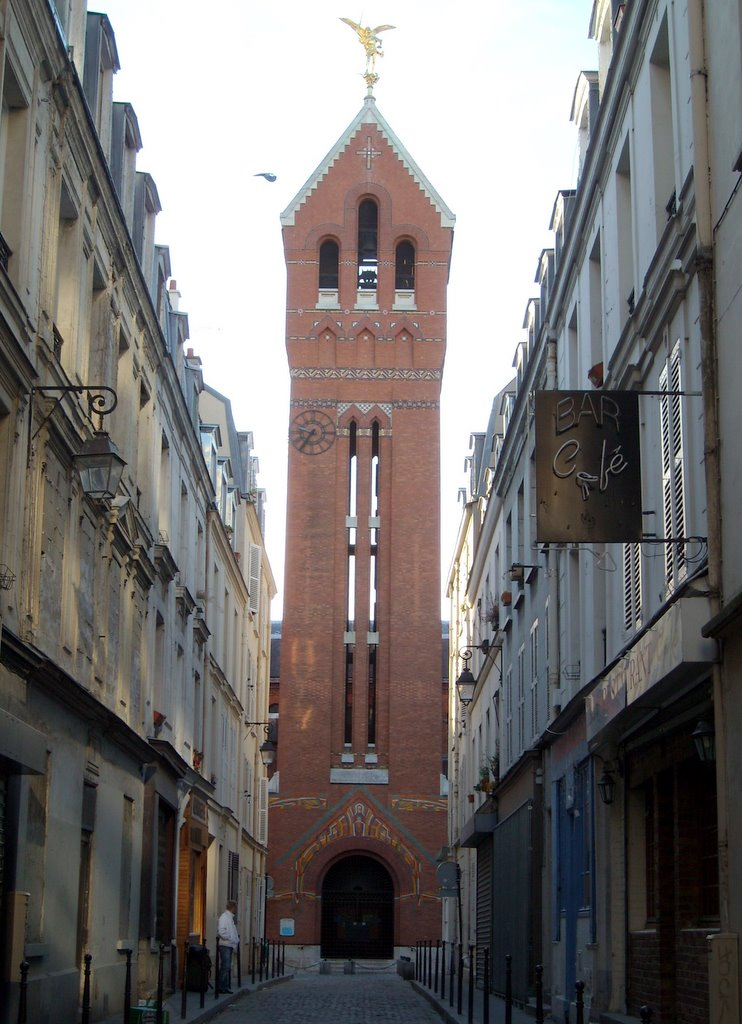
The clock tower of the Church of Saint-Michel des Batignolles

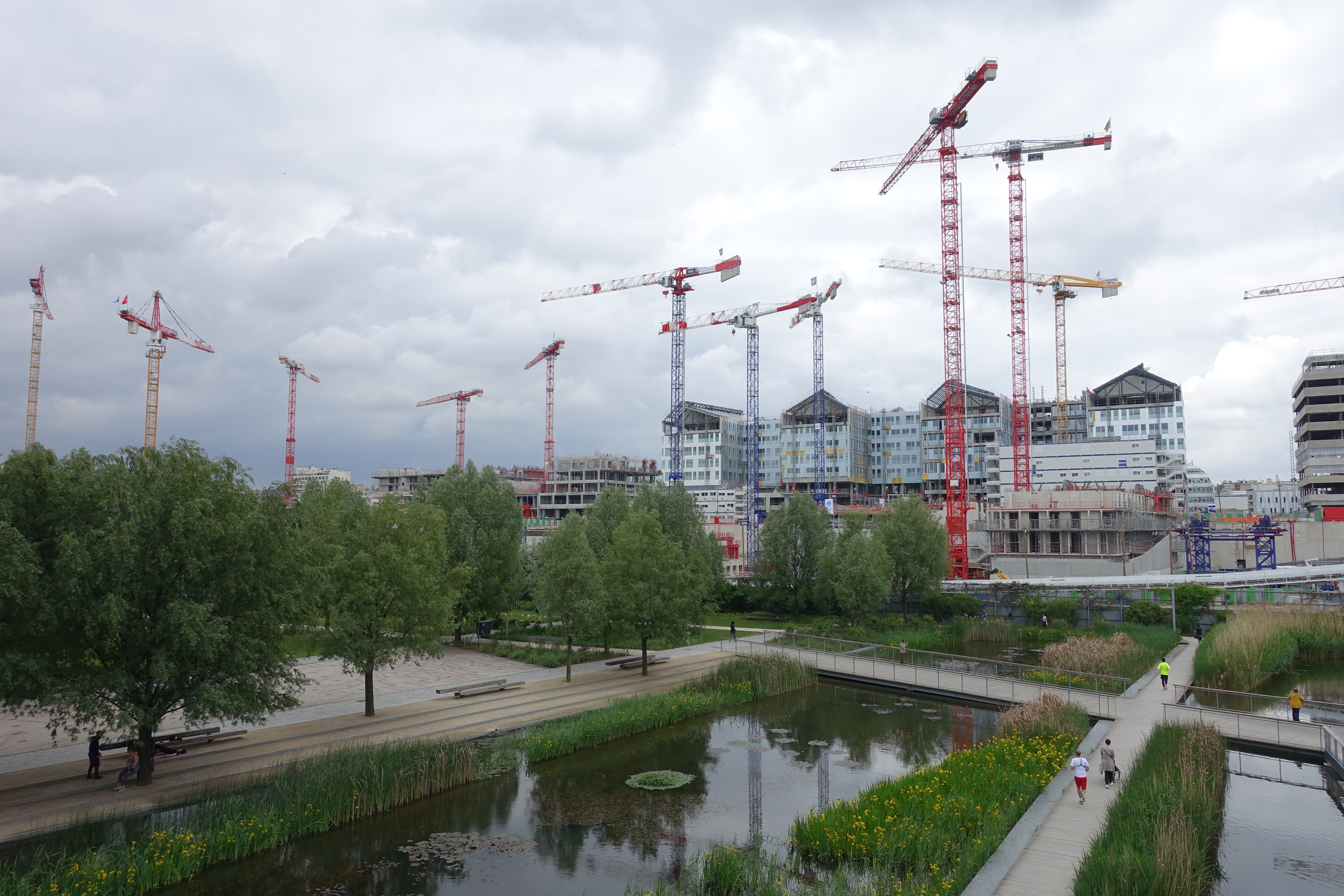
Parc Clichy-Batignolles – Martin-Luther-King

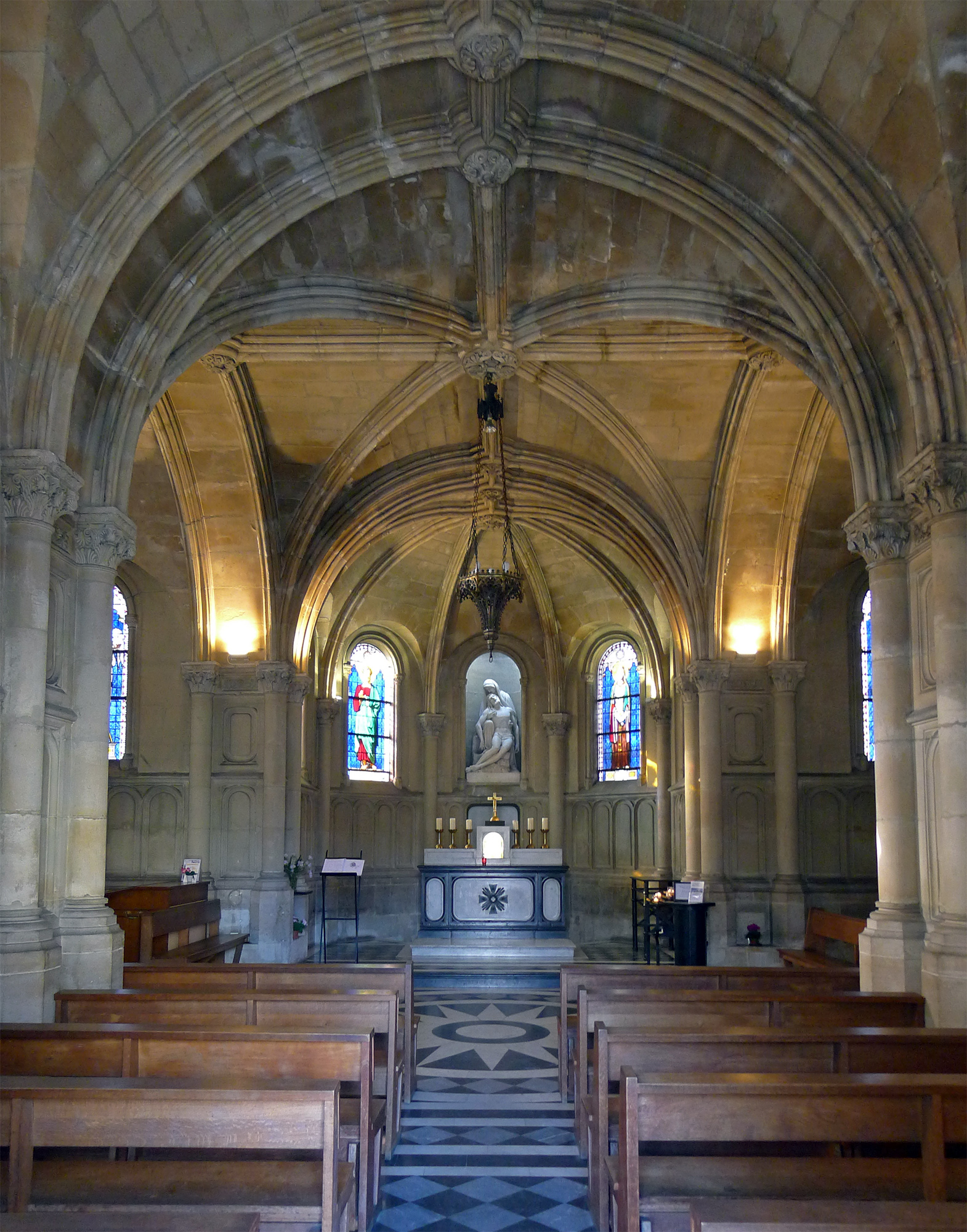
Notre-Dame-de-la-Compassion, Paris (1842-1843)

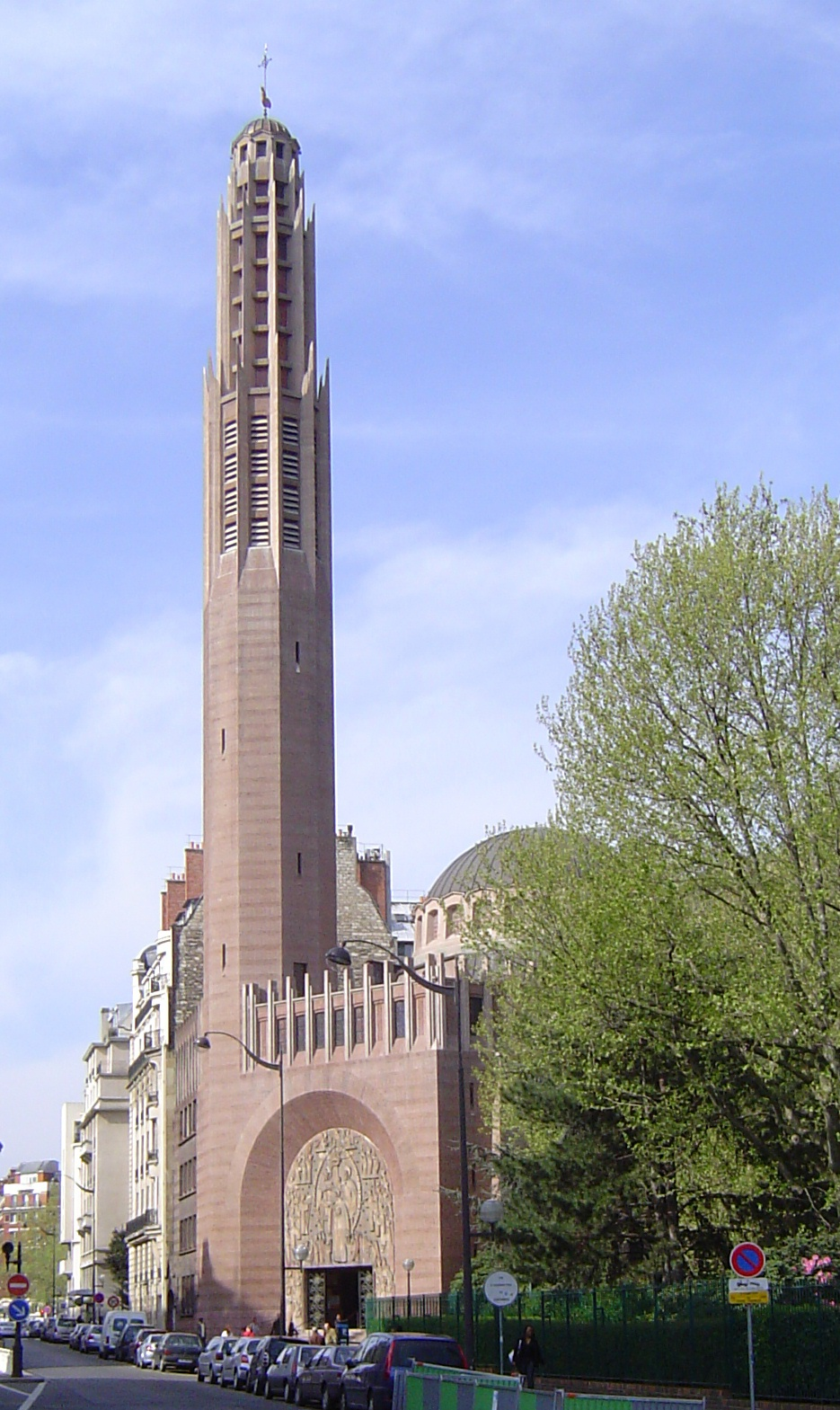
Saint Odile is a rare example of an Art Deco church in Paris.(1936-1946)

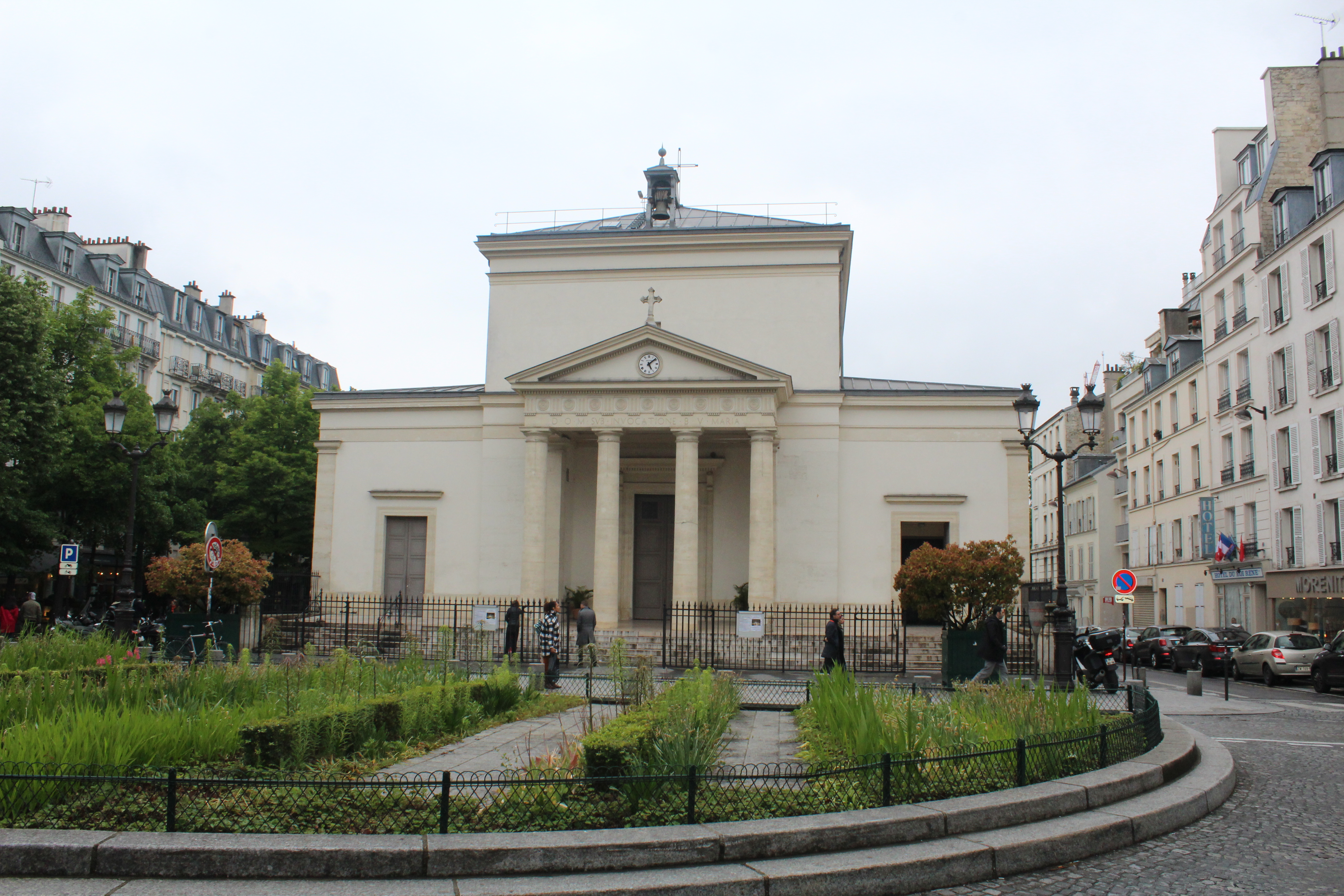
Sainte-Marie des Batignolles, modeled after a Roman temple (1851)

== Education ==
The 17th arrondissement of Paris is home to several important educational institutions, ranging from primary schools to prestigious secondary schools and higher education establishments.

In terms of primary and secondary education, the arrondissement includes numerous public and private schools. Notably, the Lycée Carnot, located in the district, is one of the most renowned public secondary schools in the area, offering a wide range of general and specialized courses.

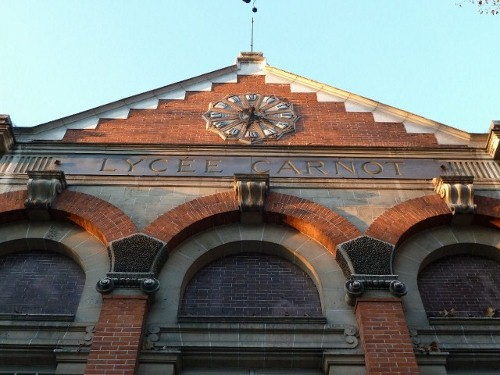
Le Lycée Carnot, à Paris 17e.

The Swedish school Svenska Skolan Paris is located in the arrondissement.

In addition to these, the École Normale de Musique de Paris, founded in 1919, provides higher education in music and is situated in the 17th arrondissement, attracting students from around the world who wish to pursue careers in music performance and composition.

The Lycée International de Paris – Honoré de Balzac, located in the Batignolles district of the 17th, is another significant institution offering an international curriculum alongside the French national program. This lycée serves a diverse student body, offering pathways in several languages and catering to both French and international students.

A prominent private school is the École Privée Sainte-Marie des Batignolles, which provides a Catholic education with an emphasis on both academics and personal development. The school serves children from kindergarten through high school and is known for its supportive community environment.

Further education institutions include several language schools and specialized professional training centers.
