= Lycée Français de Stockholm =

French international school in Stockholm, Sweden

Coordinates: 59.3209°N 17.9864°E

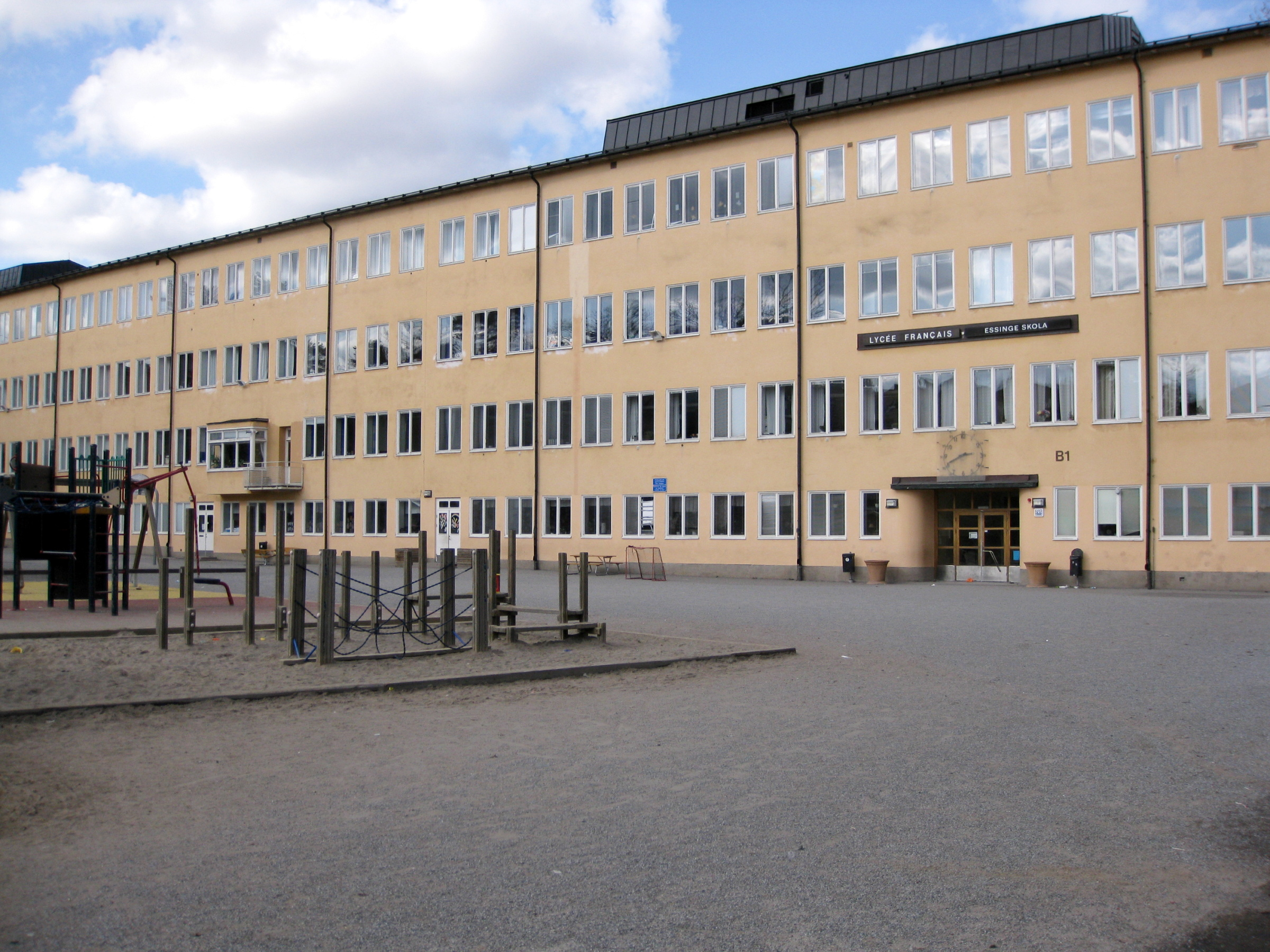
Lycée Français de Stockholm

Lycée français Saint-Louis de Stockholm is a French international school in Stockholm, Sweden. It serves levels maternelle through lycée.

== See also ==
- Svenska Skolan Paris - Swedish school in France
