= Writers in Paris =

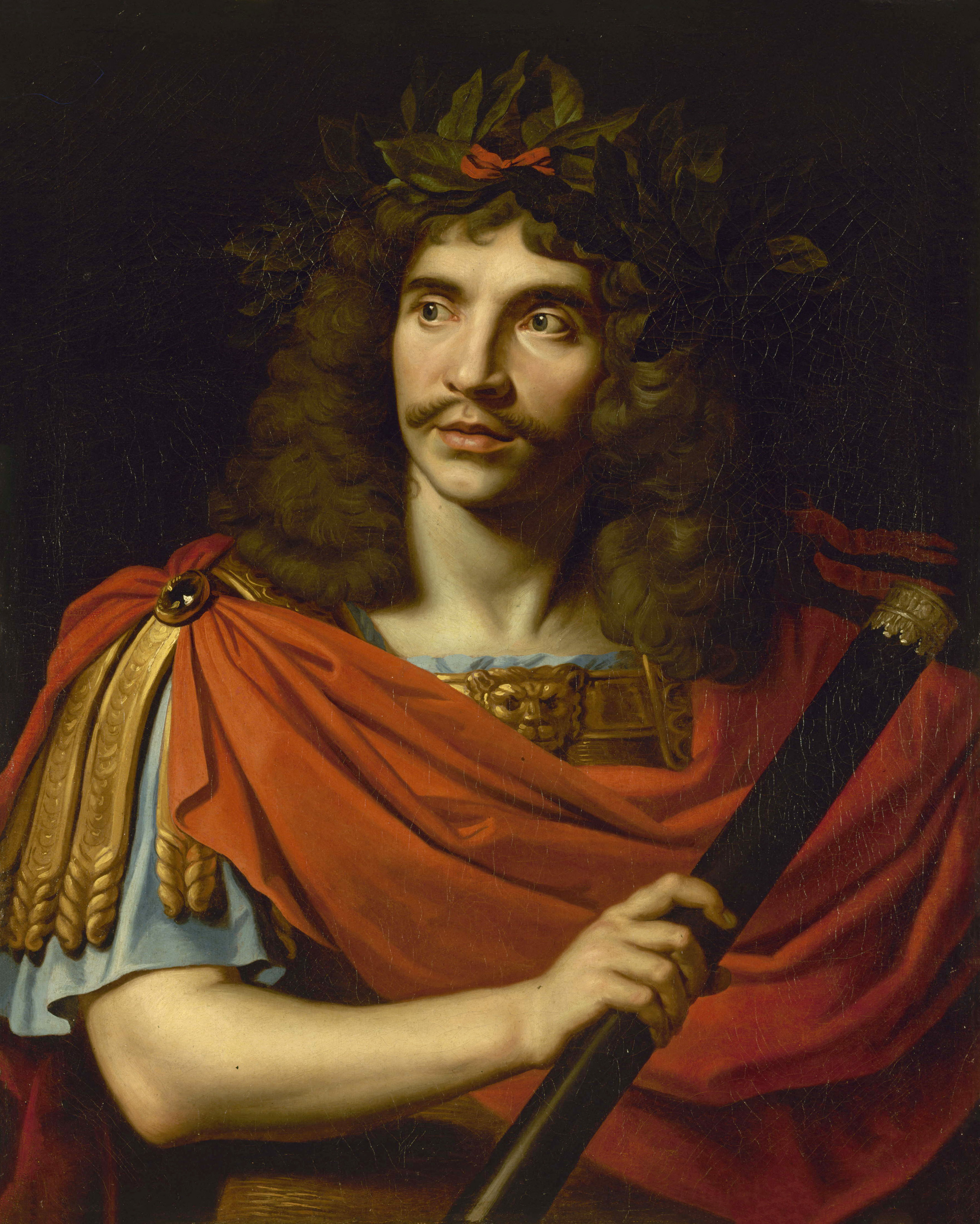
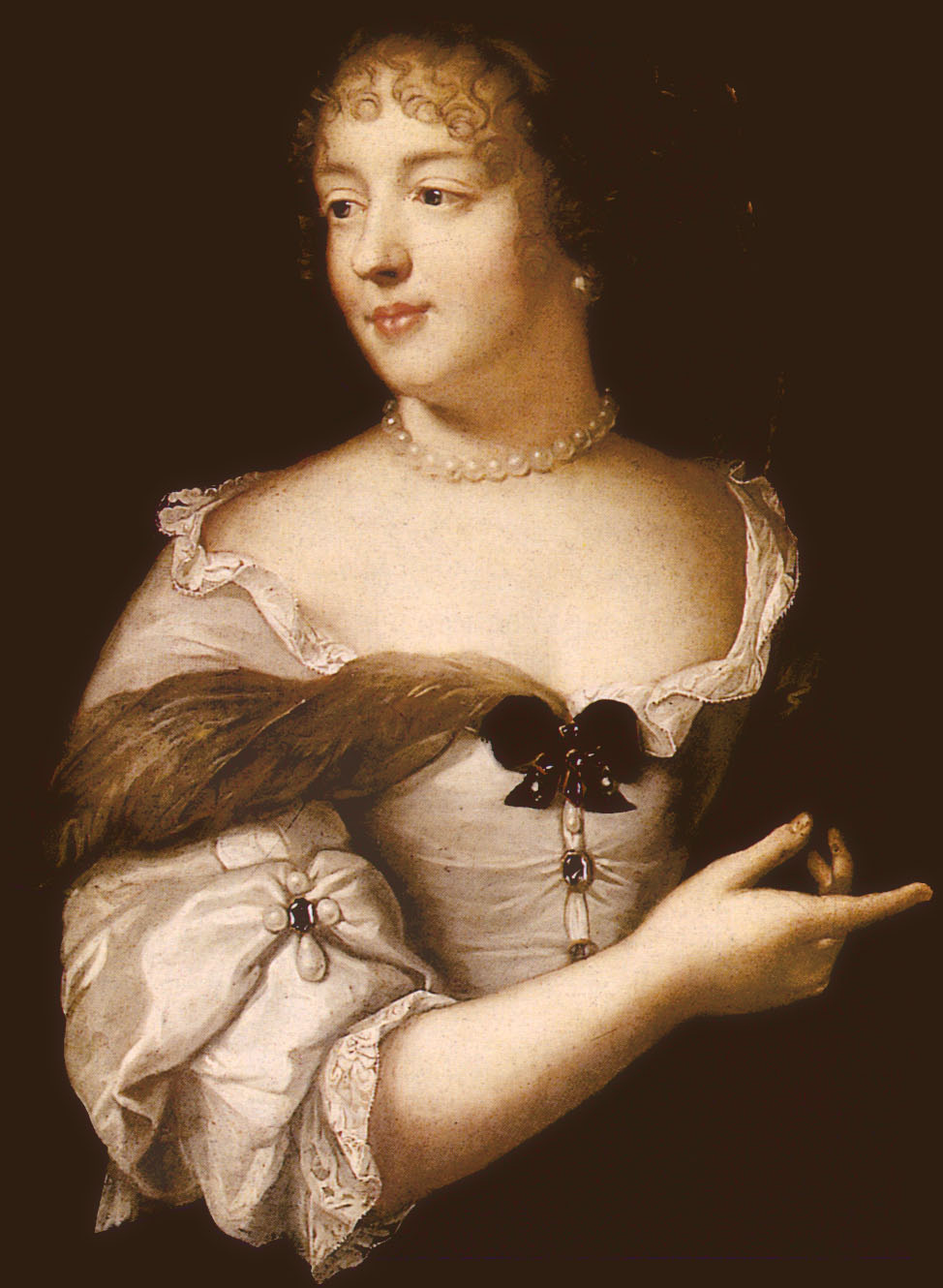
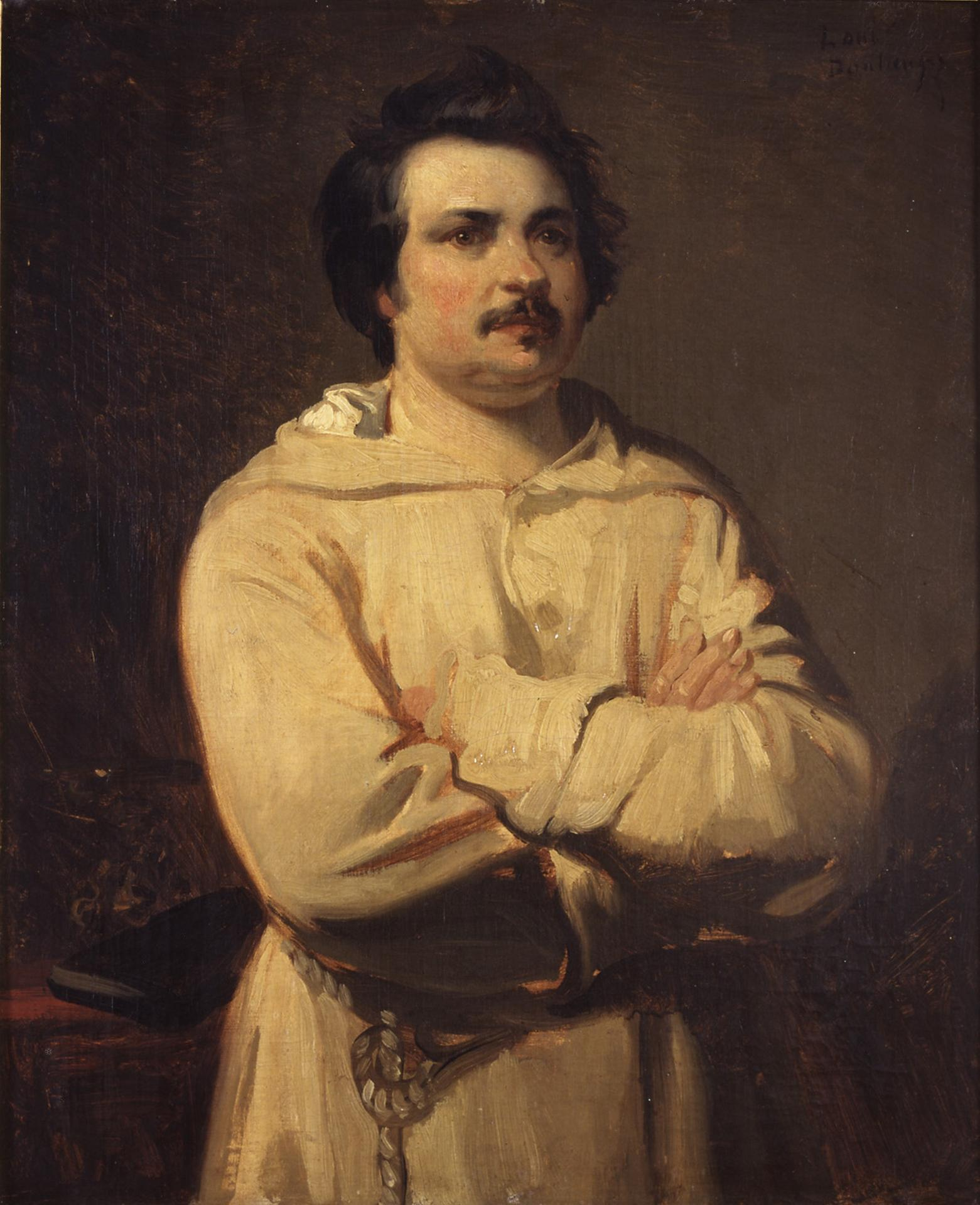
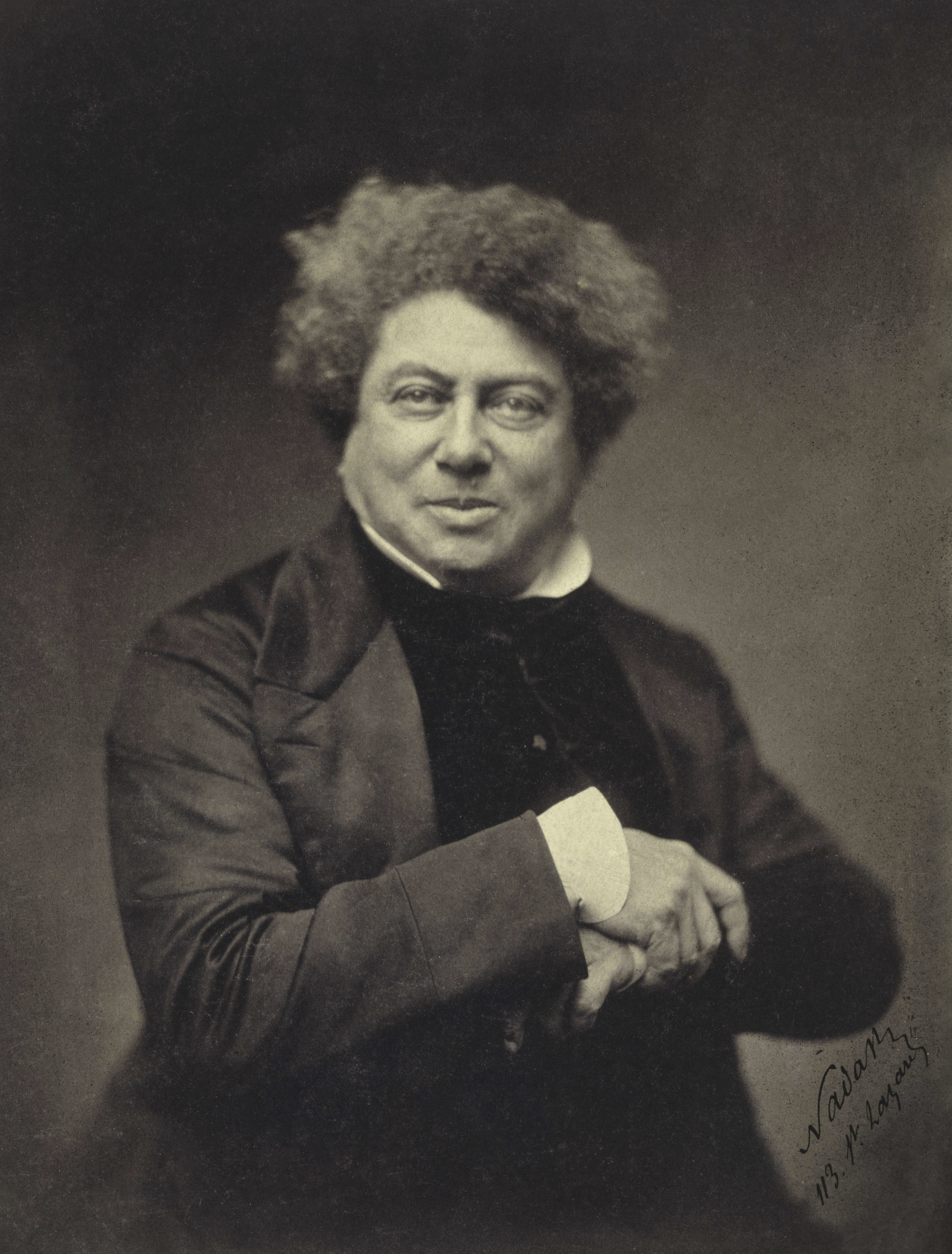
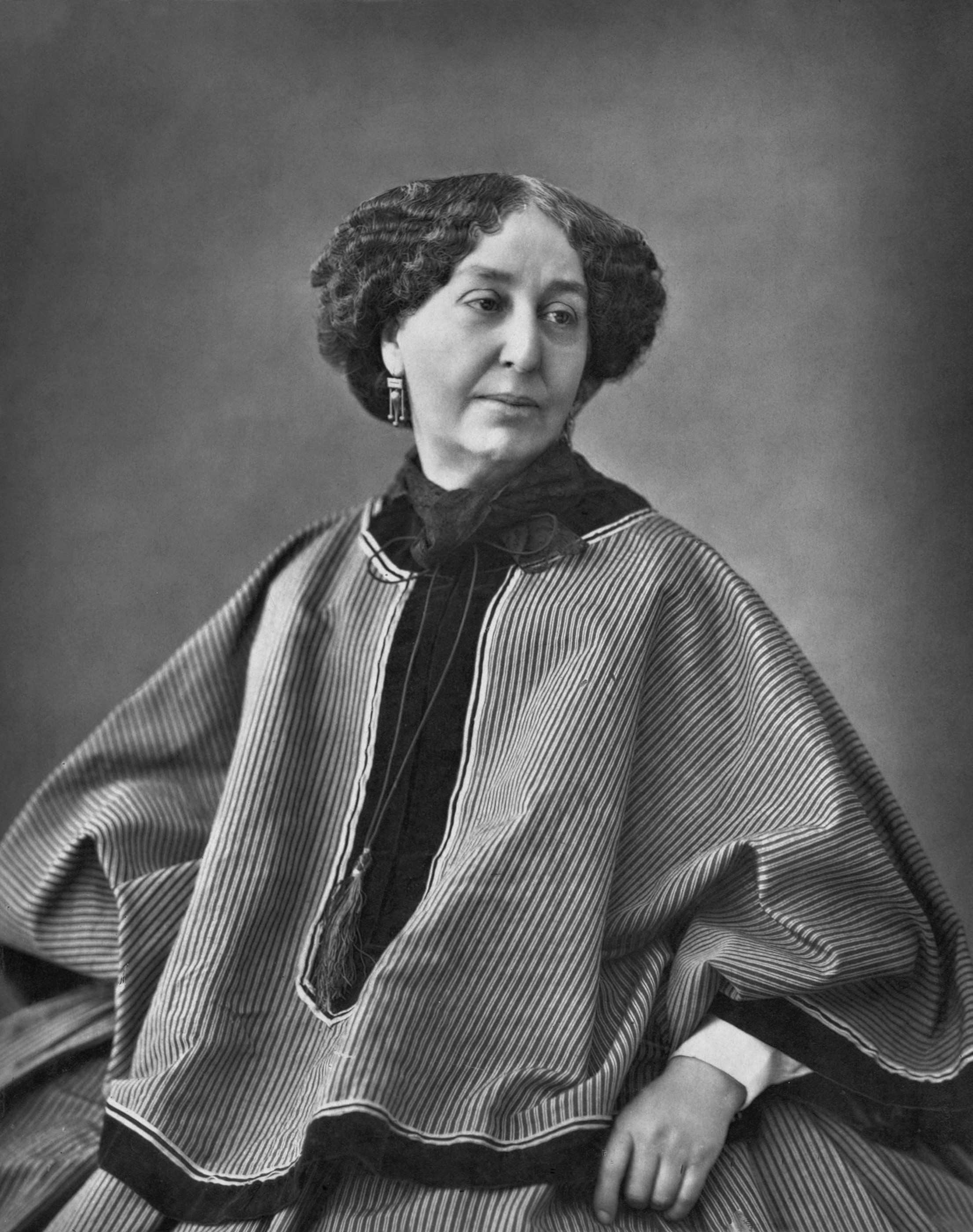
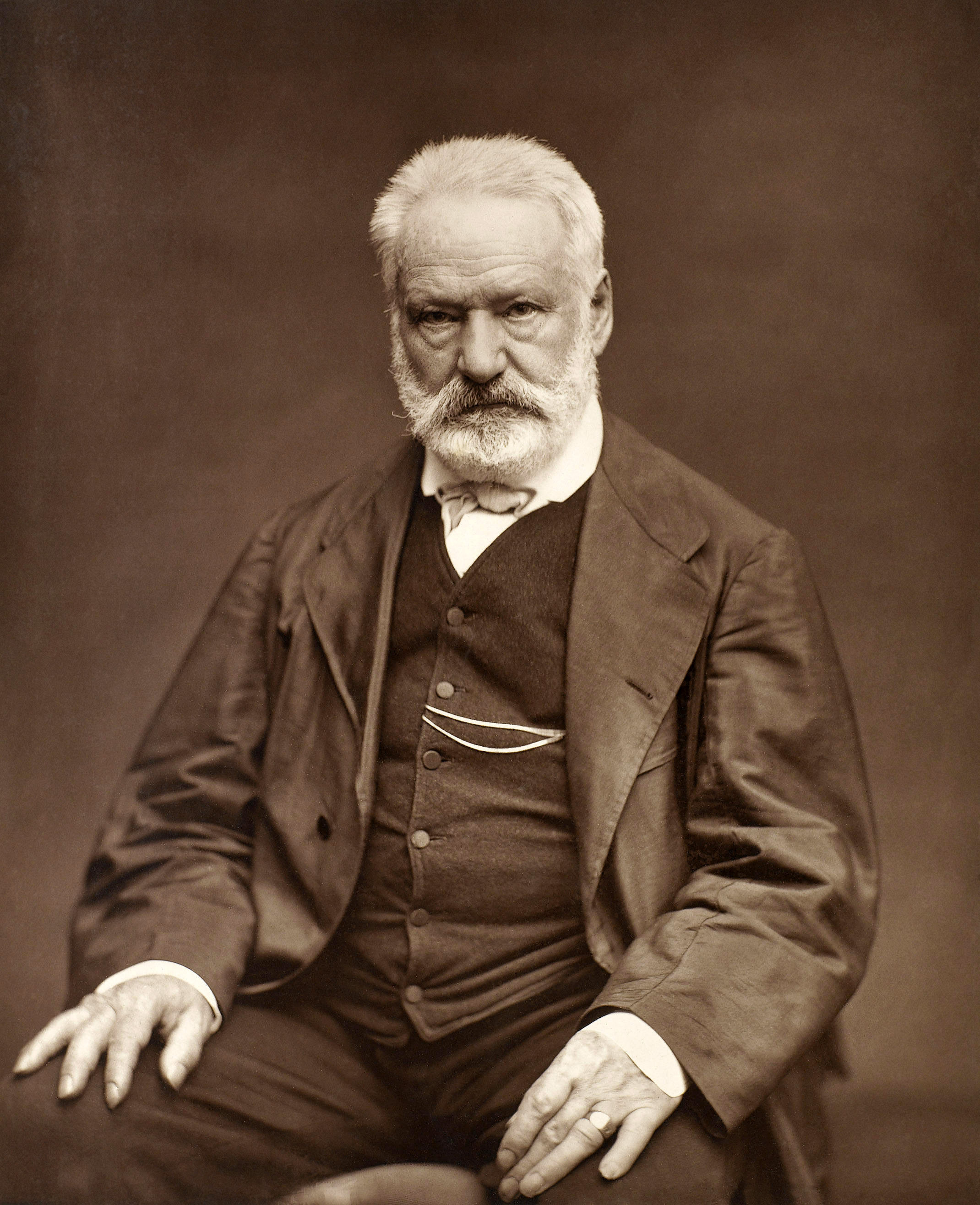
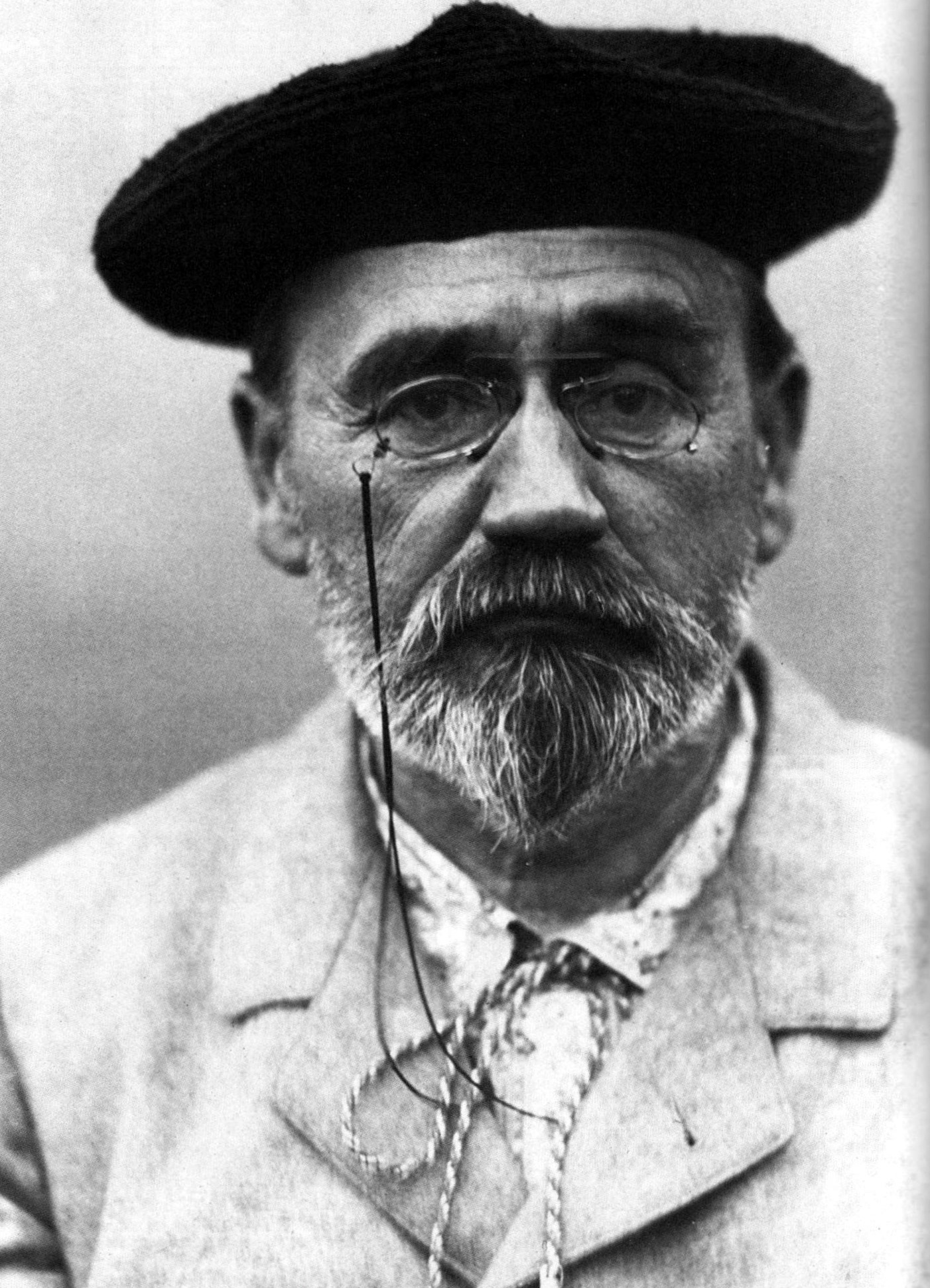
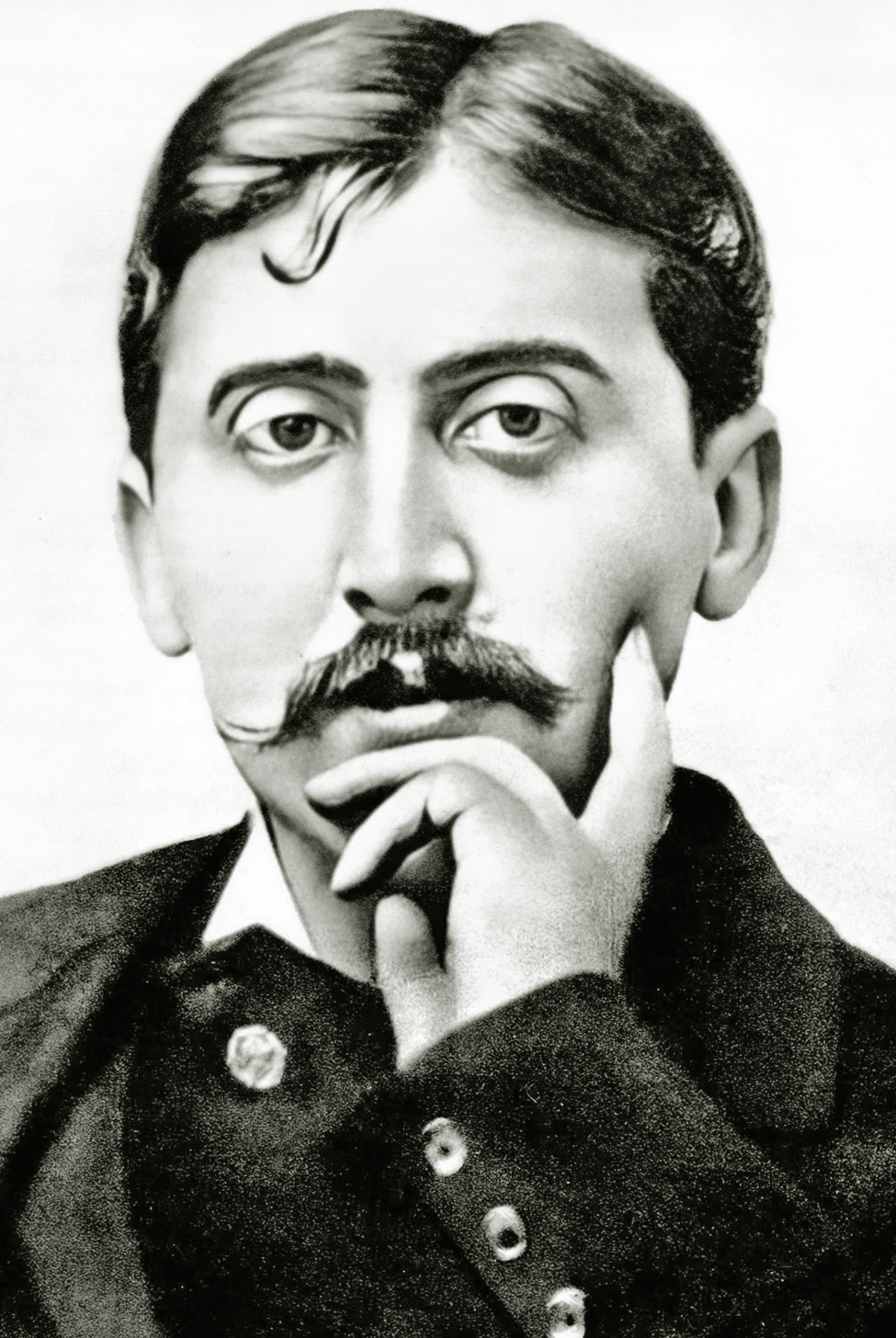
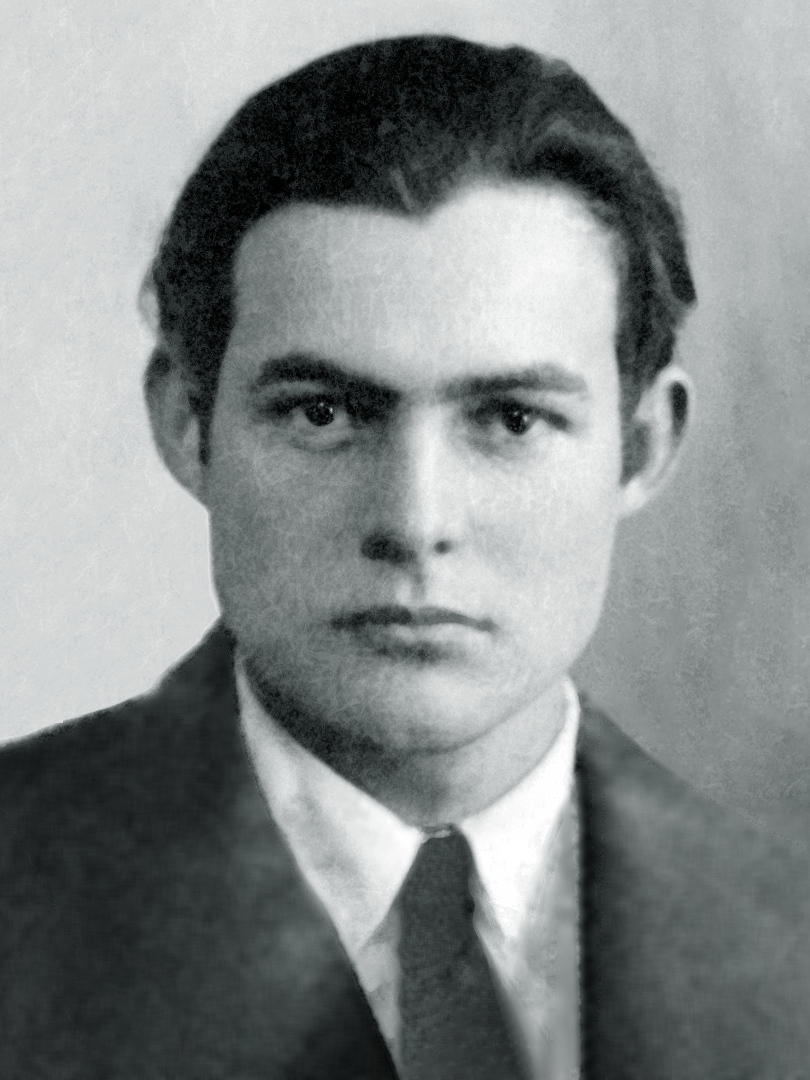
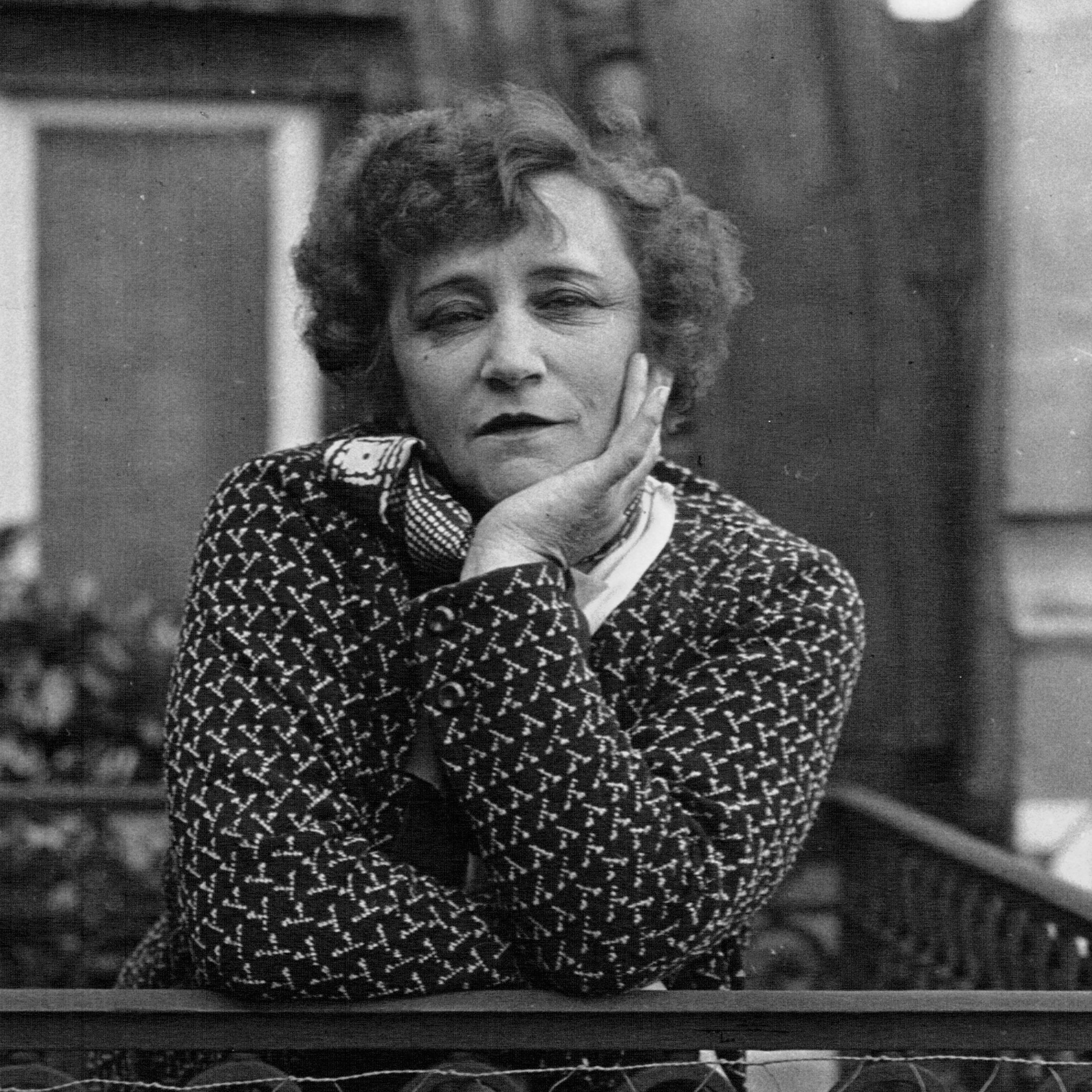
- Moliere (1658); Marquise de Sévigné (1665); Honoré de Balzac; Alexandre Dumas (1855); George Sand (1864); Victor Hugo (1876); Emile Zola (1902); Marcel Proust (1900); Ernest Hemingway (1923); Colette (1932)

For centuries Paris has been the home and frequently the subject matter of the most important novelists, poets, and playwrights in French literature, including Moliere, Voltaire, Balzac, Victor Hugo and Zola and Proust. Paris also was home to major expatriate writers from around the world, including Henry James, Ivan Turgenev, Oscar Wilde, Ernest Hemingway, James Joyce, Leopold Senghor, James Baldwin, Richard Wright, E. du Perron, Milan Kundera and Henry Miller. Few of the writers of Paris were actually born in Paris; they were attracted to the city first because of its university, then because it was the center of the French publishing industry, home of the major French newspapers and journals, of its important literary salons, and the company of the other writers, poets, and artists.

== A literary Emperor in Lutetia (4th century) ==
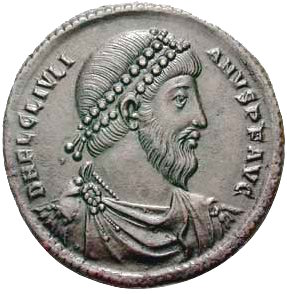
Roman coin with the portrait of Julian, who spent his winters writing in Paris

Before Paris was Paris, while it was still Lutetia, a middle-sized provincial town of the Roman Empire, it was the home of an important writer and philosopher: the Roman Emperor Julian. The nephew of the Emperor Constantine, he arrived in Lutetia in February 358 at the age of twenty-five as commander of the Roman armies in Gaul. He was raised to the title of Emperor by his soldiers in 360, and thereafter spent his summers on military campaigns in different parts of the Empire, and his winters in Paris, in the Roman governor's palace on the Ile de la Cité where the Conciergerie is located today. His writings were mostly philosophical, largely criticism of the new religion of Christianity, which had recently appeared in Gaul, but he also wrote about nature, geography, and his philosophy of life. He was killed in battle against the Persians in 363 and was later given the posthumous title of Julian the Apostate by the Catholic Church.

== The Middle Ages ==
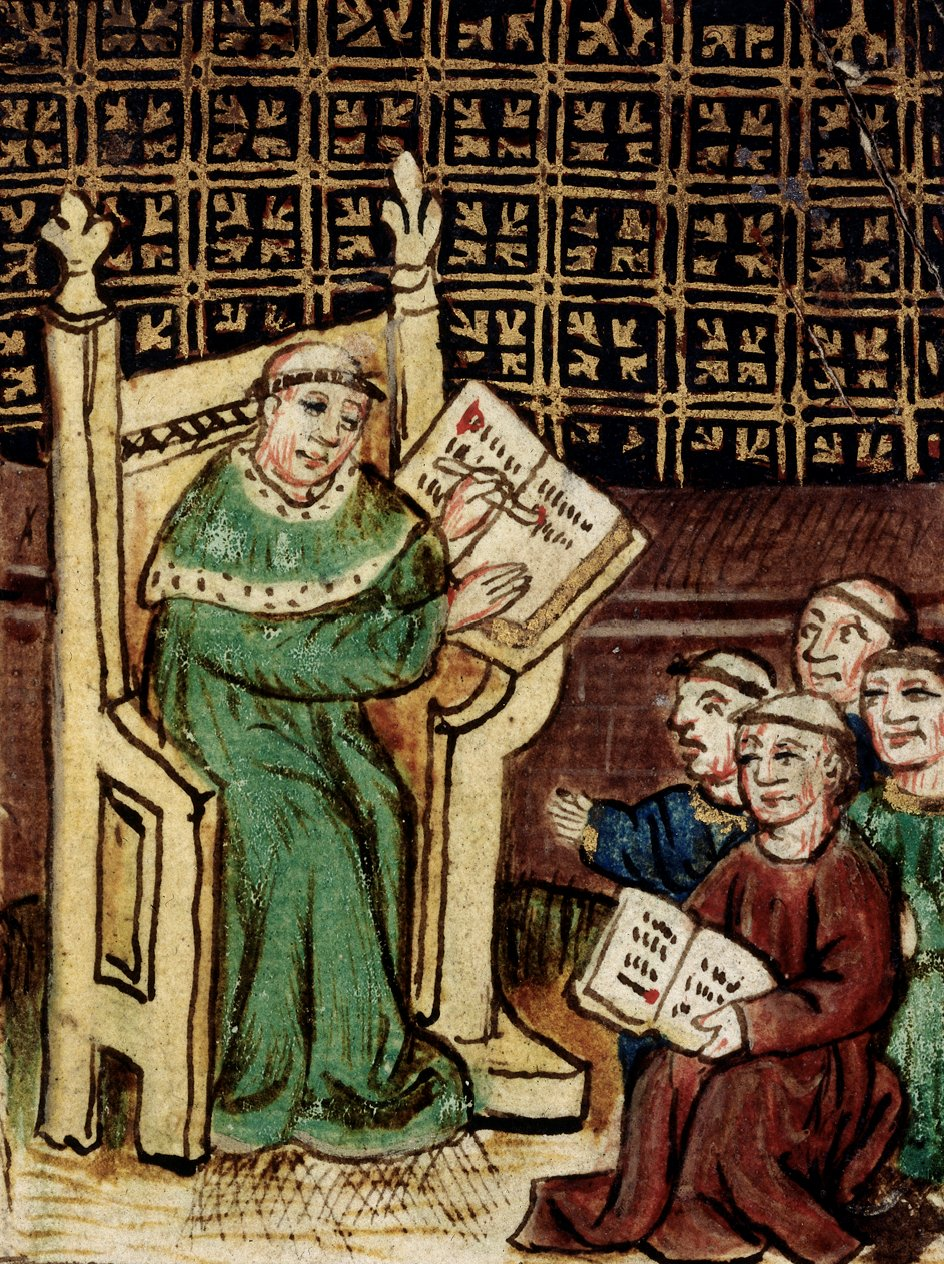
A scholar and students at the University of Paris, by Gautier de Metz (1464)

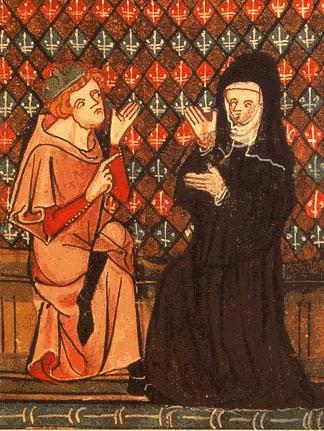
The monk and scholar Abélard and the nun Héloïse begin a legendary Paris romance in about 1116. Illustration of the couple in a manuscript of the Roman de la Rose (1490s))

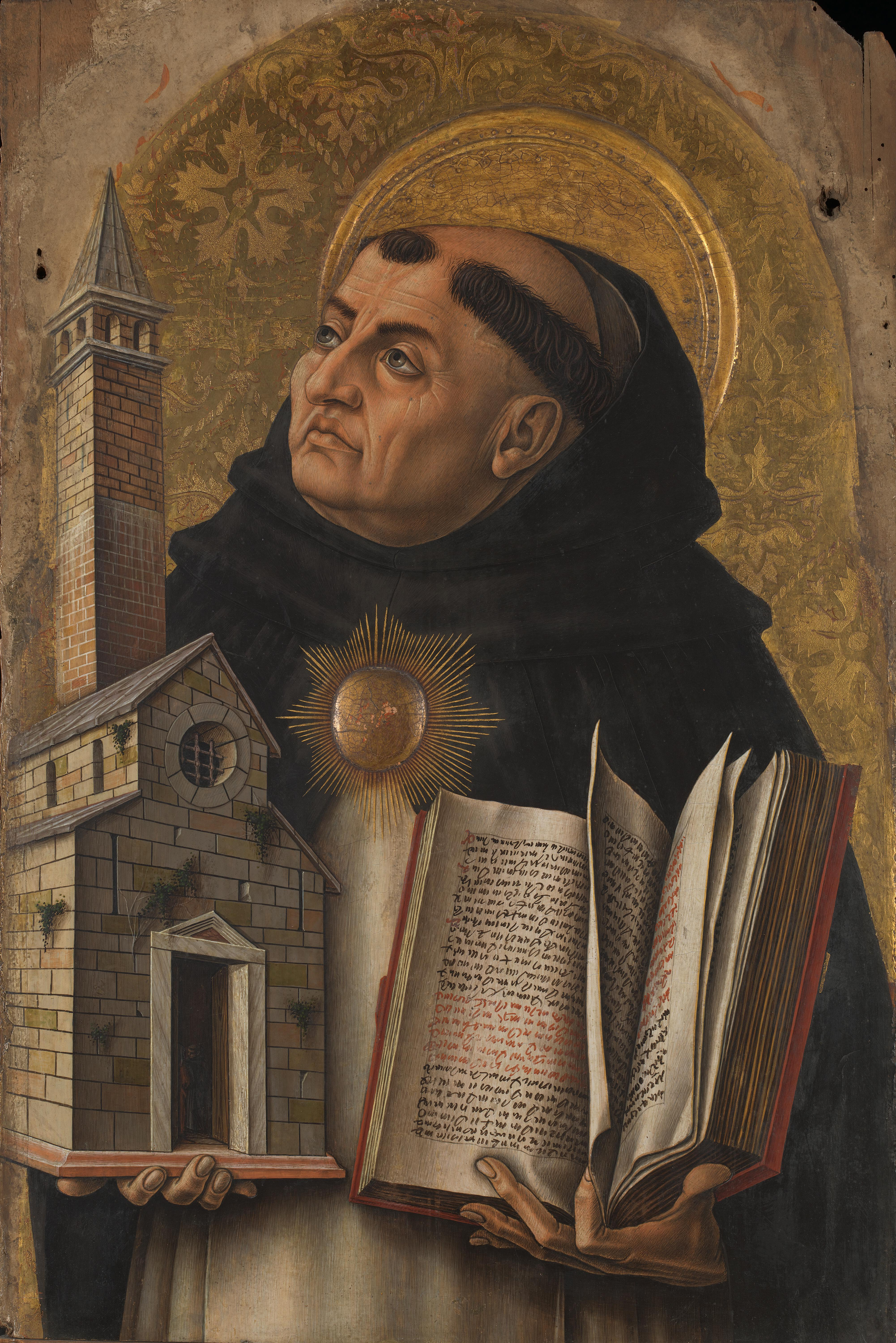
Saint Thomas Aquinas wrote and lectured at the University of Paris

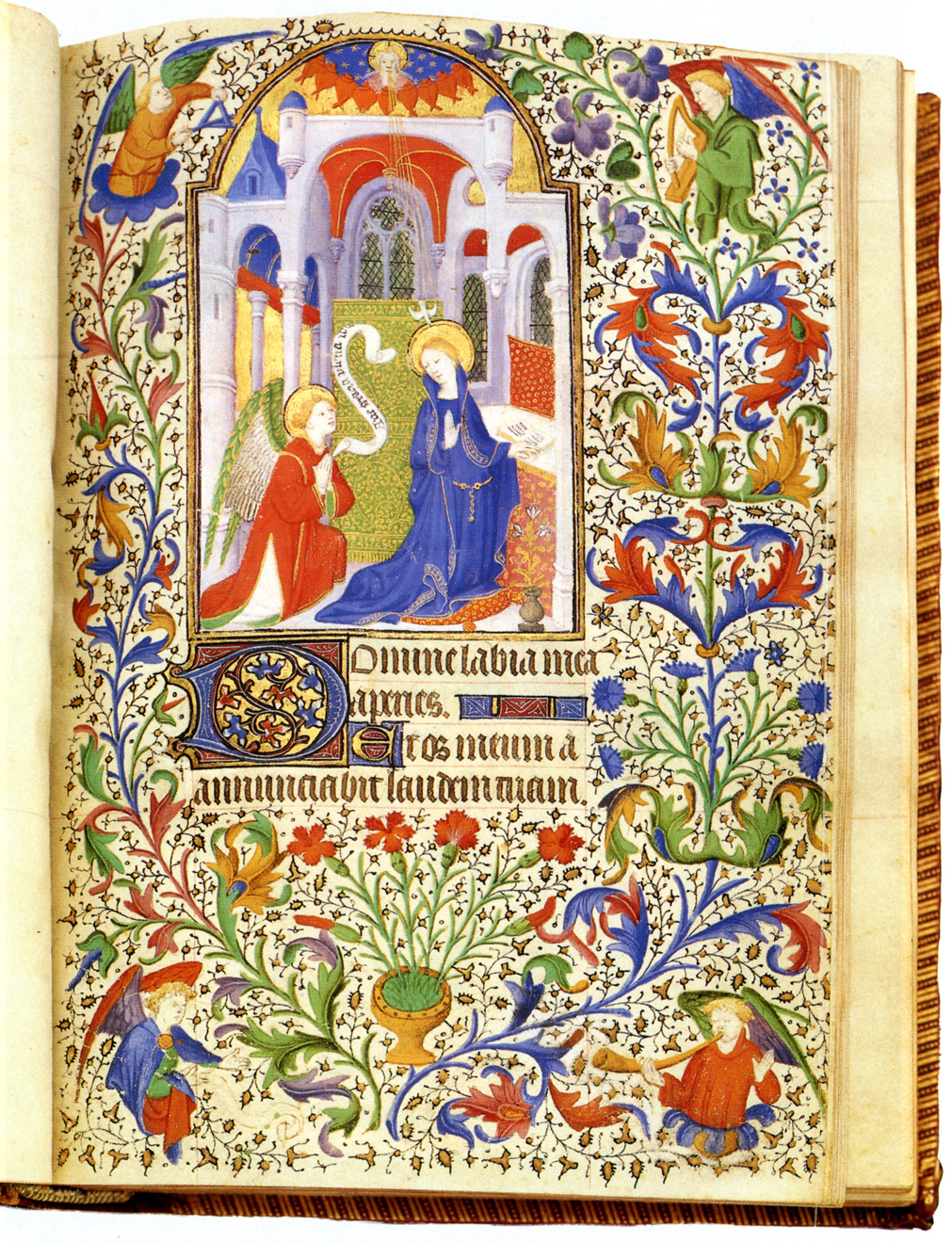
A Book of Hours from Paris (about 1410)

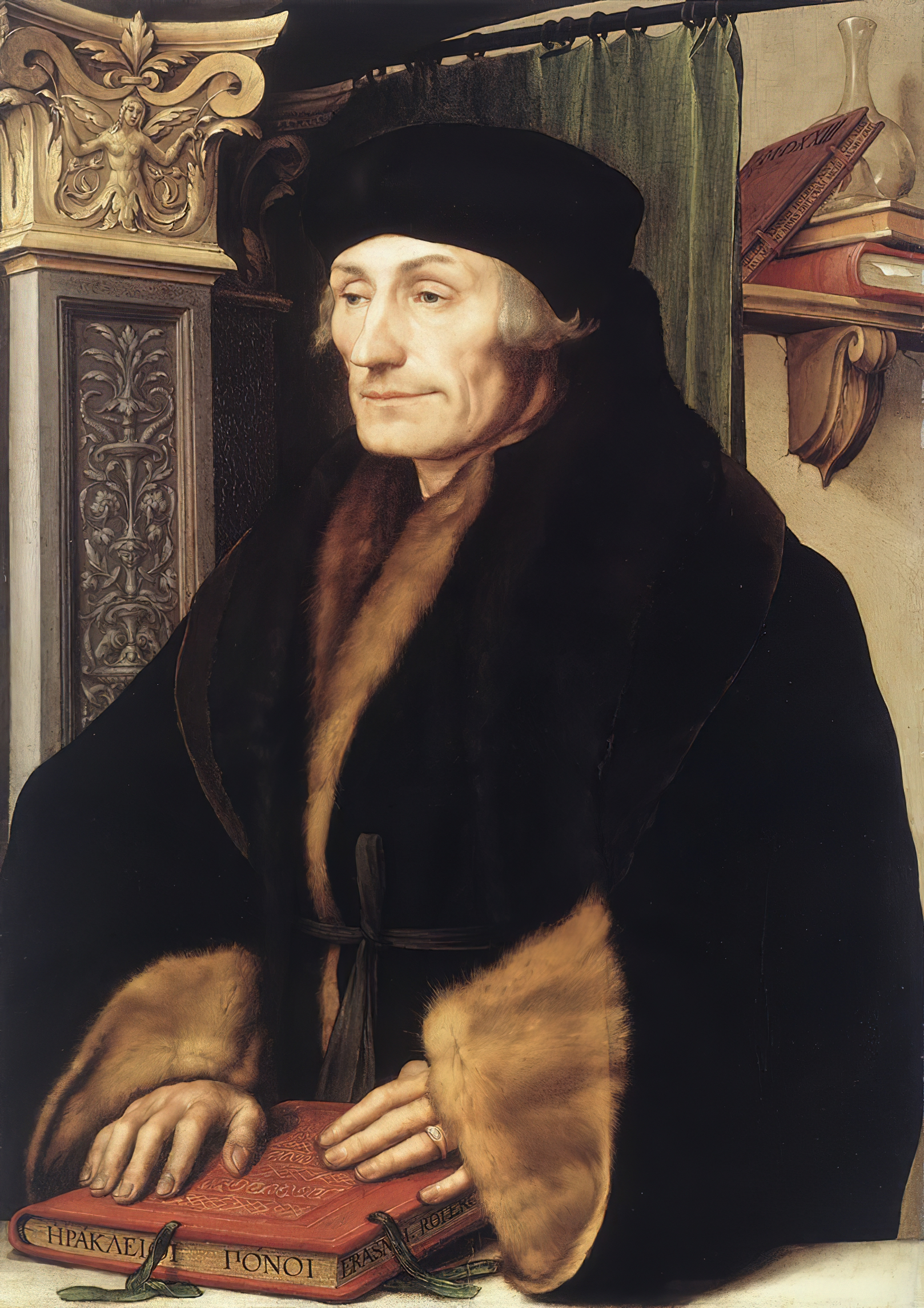
The Humanist scholar Erasmus taught and wrote at the University of Paris at the end of the 15th century

The primary centers of literary and intellectual activity in Paris in the Middle Ages were the schools attached to the major monasteries, and, beginning in the 12th century, the University of Paris, which made Paris one of the great learning centers of Europe. One of the most important new schools was established on the left bank at the Abbey of Sainte-Genevieve; its teachers included the scholar Pierre Abelard (1079–1142), who taught five thousand students. Abelard was forced to leave the university because of the scandal caused by his romance with the nun Eloise. The schools trained not only clerics for the church, but also clerks who could read and write for the growing administration of the Kingdom. . In the 13th century there were between two and three thousand students living in the Left Bank, which became known as the Latin Quarter, because Latin was the language of instruction at the university. The number grew to about four thousand in the 14th century. In 1257, the chaplain of Louis IX, Robert de Sorbon, opened the most famous College of the university, which was later named after him, the Sorbonne.From the 13th to the 15th century, the University of Paris was the most important school of catholic theology in Western Europe, whose teachers included Roger Bacon from England, Saint Thomas Aquinas from Italy, and Saint Bonaventure from Germany. The teachings of the scholars, in Latin, were circulated widely, not only in France but throughout Europe. Erasmus also taught and wrote at the university, as did the religious reformer John Calvin, before he was forced to flee to Switzerland because his writings were considered heretical.

The first illuminated manuscripts began to be produced by Paris workshops in the 11th century. At first they were created by monks in the Abbeys, particularly Saint-Denis, Saint-Maur-des-Fossés, Notre-Dame and Saint-Germain-des-Prés; the first recognized artist of the period was the monk Ingelard, who painted miniatures at the Abbey of Saint-Germain-des-Prés between 1030 and 1060. As the Middle Ages progressed and the illuminated works became more valuable, they began to be produced by noted artists in workshops for the court and for the wealthy merchants. One notable example is the Hours of Jeanne d'Evreux, made by Jean Pucelle for the third wife of Charles IV between 1325 and 1328, now in the Metropolitan Museum in New York. The first lnon-religious literary works, most romances, began to appear at about the same time, and were collected by the nobles and wealthy of Paris. The Roman de la Rose was the most famous of these works; four handmade copies made in Paris in the 1490s still exist.

== 16th Century – Rabelais and Ronsard ==
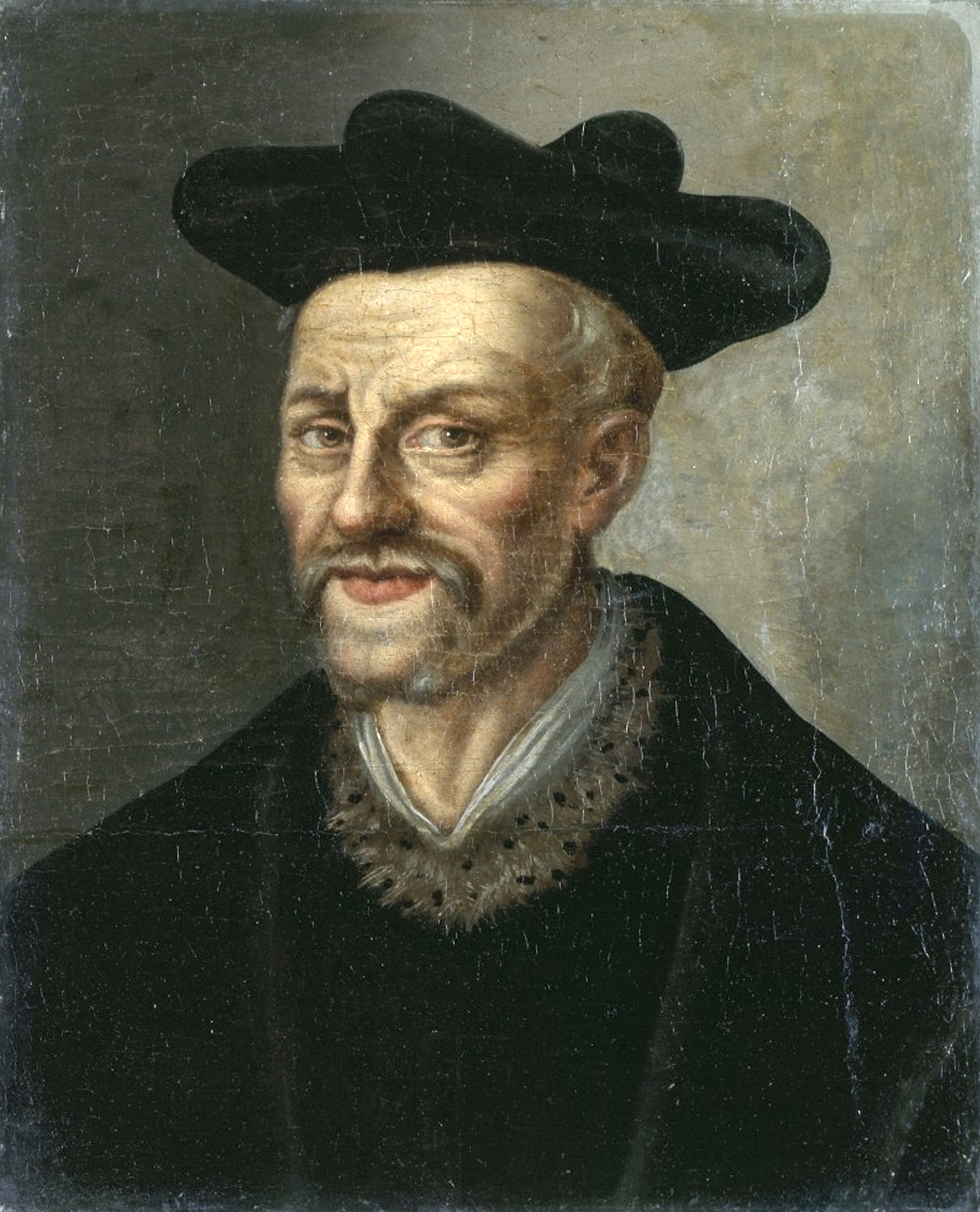
François Rabelais

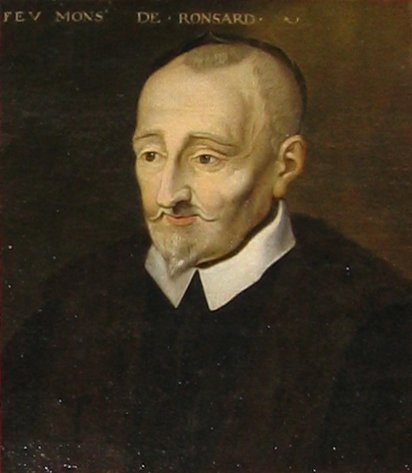
Pierre de Ronsard (1620 portrait by unknown artist)

The most prominent Paris novelist of the period was François Rabelais (1494–1553) best known for his novel Gargantua and Pantagruel, which gave the word "Gargantuan" to the English language. He was admired by King Francis I, who protected him while he was alive, but after the King's death Rabelais and his works were condemned by the University of Paris and the Parlement of Paris, and he only survived because of the protection of high figures at court. He spent much of his life far from the city, but died in Paris.

The most prominent poet was Pierre de Ronsard (1524–1585), from an aristocratic family of the Vendôme region. He settled in the Latin quarter, studied briefly at the College of Navarre, then became a Page to the Dauphin, the eldest son of Francis I. His first poem was published in 1547 by one of the many small publishing houses that had appeared around the university. He formed a literary circle with Joachim du Bellay and a group of other poets, and published a series of books of poetry on love and romance and a volume of erotic poems. The latter volume, Les Folastries, caused a scandal, and the Parlement of Paris ordered that all the copies be burned. Despite this (or because of this), Ronsard was a favorite of the Court during the reigns of Henry II, Francis II, Charles IX and Henry III. He gave poetry-writing lessons to Charles IX. However, by 1574 and the reign of Henry III, as the wars of religion began, his poetry was less in royal favor. He continued to write peacefully within the Collège de Boncourt, attached to the Collège de Navarre, until his last days.

Many of his poems had Paris settings; one poem from Sonnets pour Hélène, was set in the new Tuileries gardens, created by Catherine de' Medici:

"Quand je pense à ce jour où, pres d'une fontaine,
Dans le jardin royal ravi de ta douceur
Amour te decouvrit les secrets de mon coeur;
Et de combien de maux j'avais mon âme pleine..."

(When I think of that day when, near a fountain in the royal garden, enchanted by your gentleness. Love revealed to you the secrets of my heart, And how much pain had filled my soul...)

== 17th century – The Academie Française ==
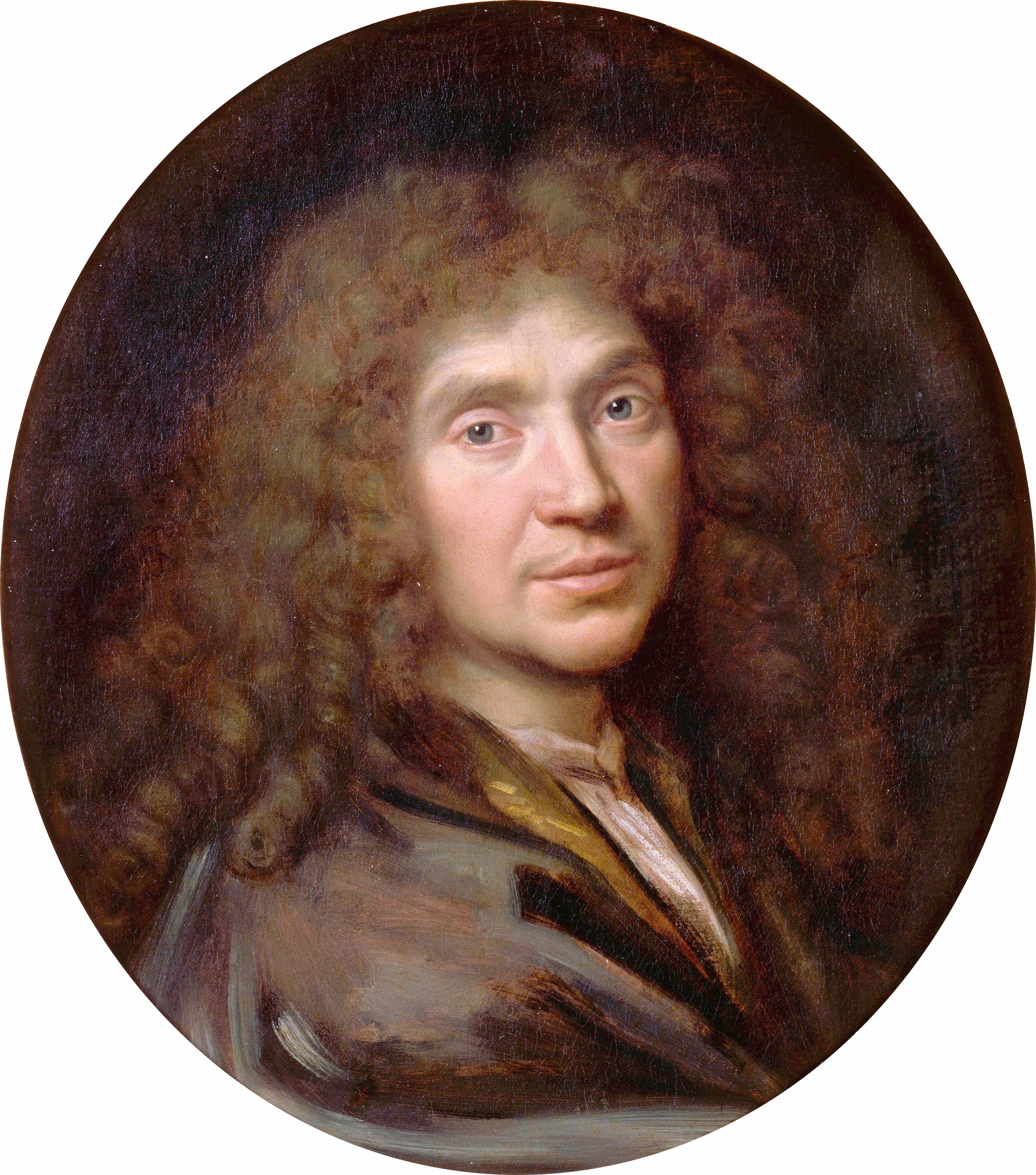
Moliere in 1658

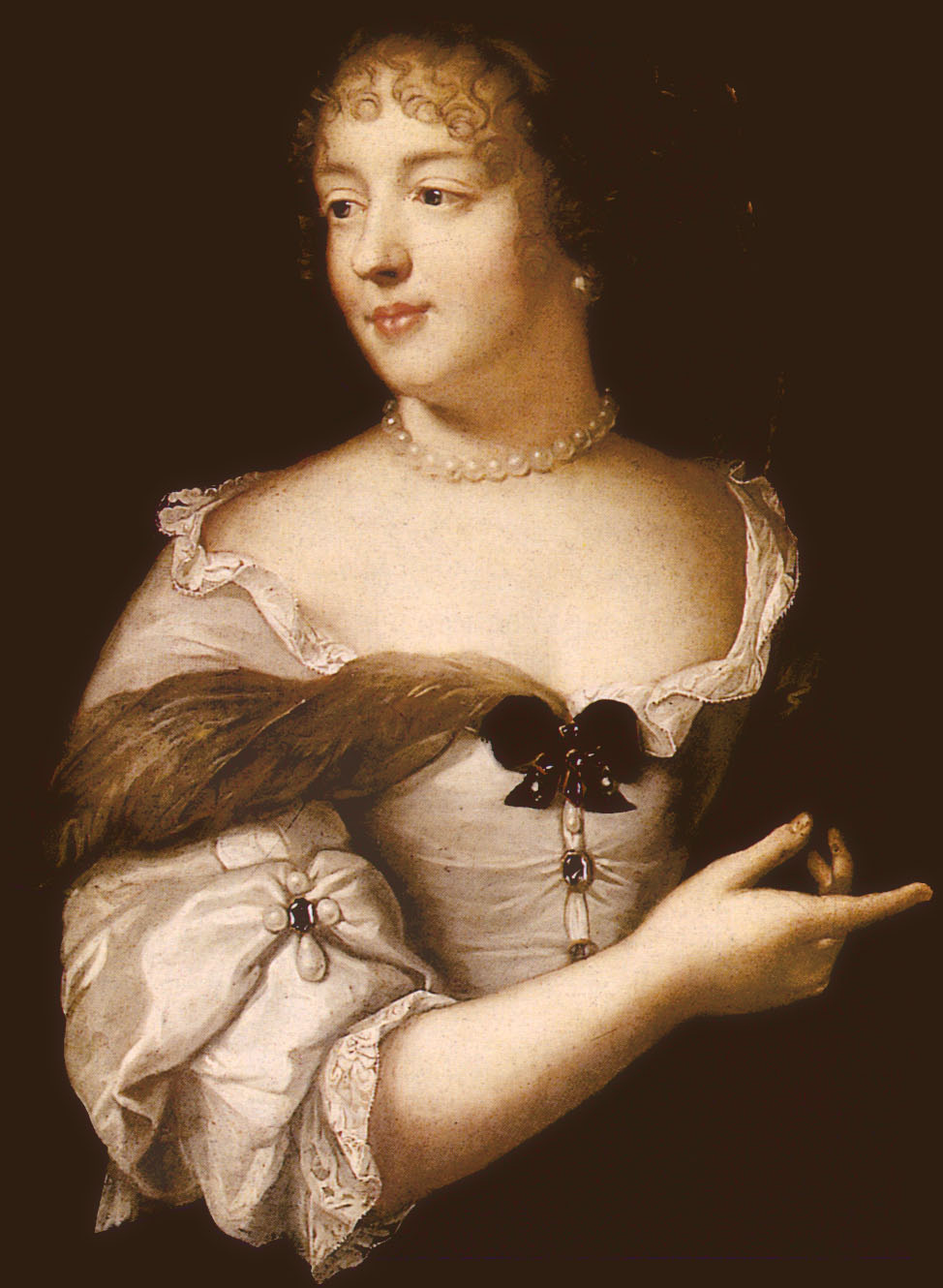
Madame de Sévigné (1626-1696) was celebrated for her letters describing every aspect of Paris life

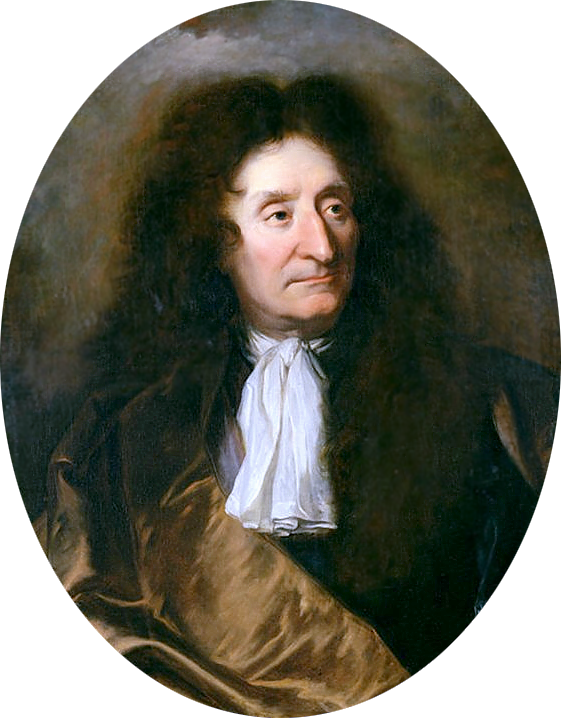
Jean de La Fontaine

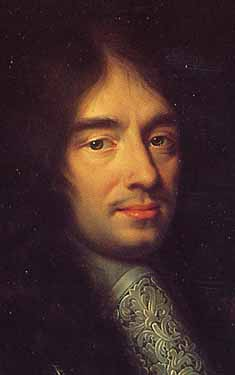
Charles Perrault, the author of Sleeping Beauty and other classic fairy tales, in 1672.

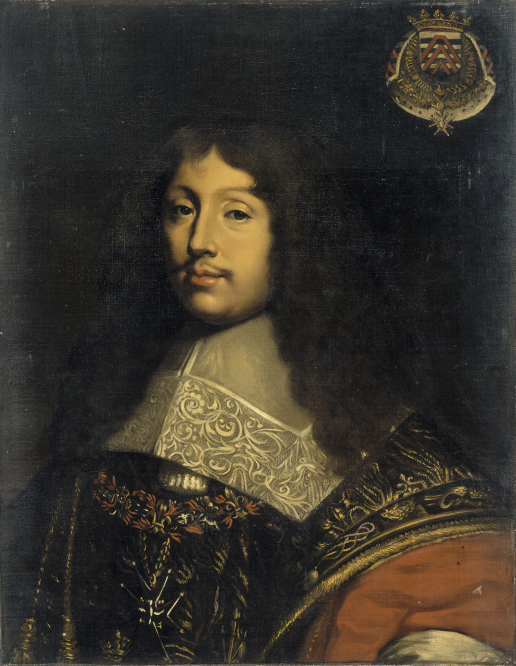
François de La Rochefoucauld was famous for his maxims and his memoires

Of the prominent French writers of the century, Moliere, the Marquise de Sévigné, La Rochefoucauld and Charles Perrault were all born in Paris. Pierre Corneille was from Normandy, Descartes from the Touraine, Jean Racine and La Fontaine from Champagne; they were all drawn to Paris by the publishing houses, theaters, and literary salons of the city.

The first literary academy, the Académie Française, was formally by Cardinal Richelieu on January 27, 1635, to honor but also to exert control over the literary figures of France . Writers knew that any published word critical of the King or court would lead their exile from Paris. This happened to one of the founding members of the academy, Roger de Bussy-Rabutin, who in 1660 wrote a scandalous satirical novel about life at the court of Louis XIV, which was circulated privately to amuse his friends. Although it was never published, he was banished from Paris to his chateau in Burgundy.

== 18th Century ==
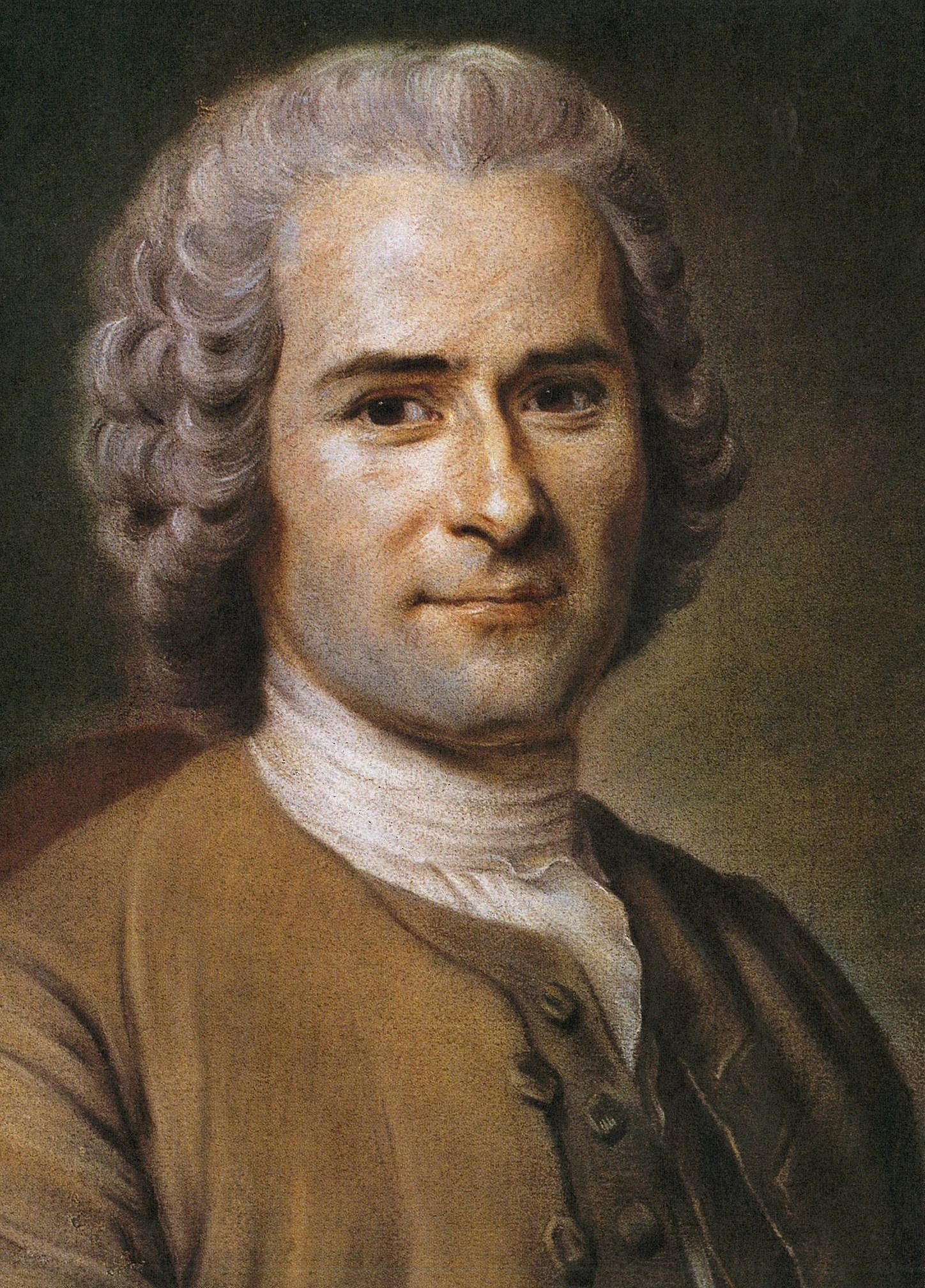
Jean-Jacques Rousseau (1712-1778) was Swiss, but became the most influential writer in Paris

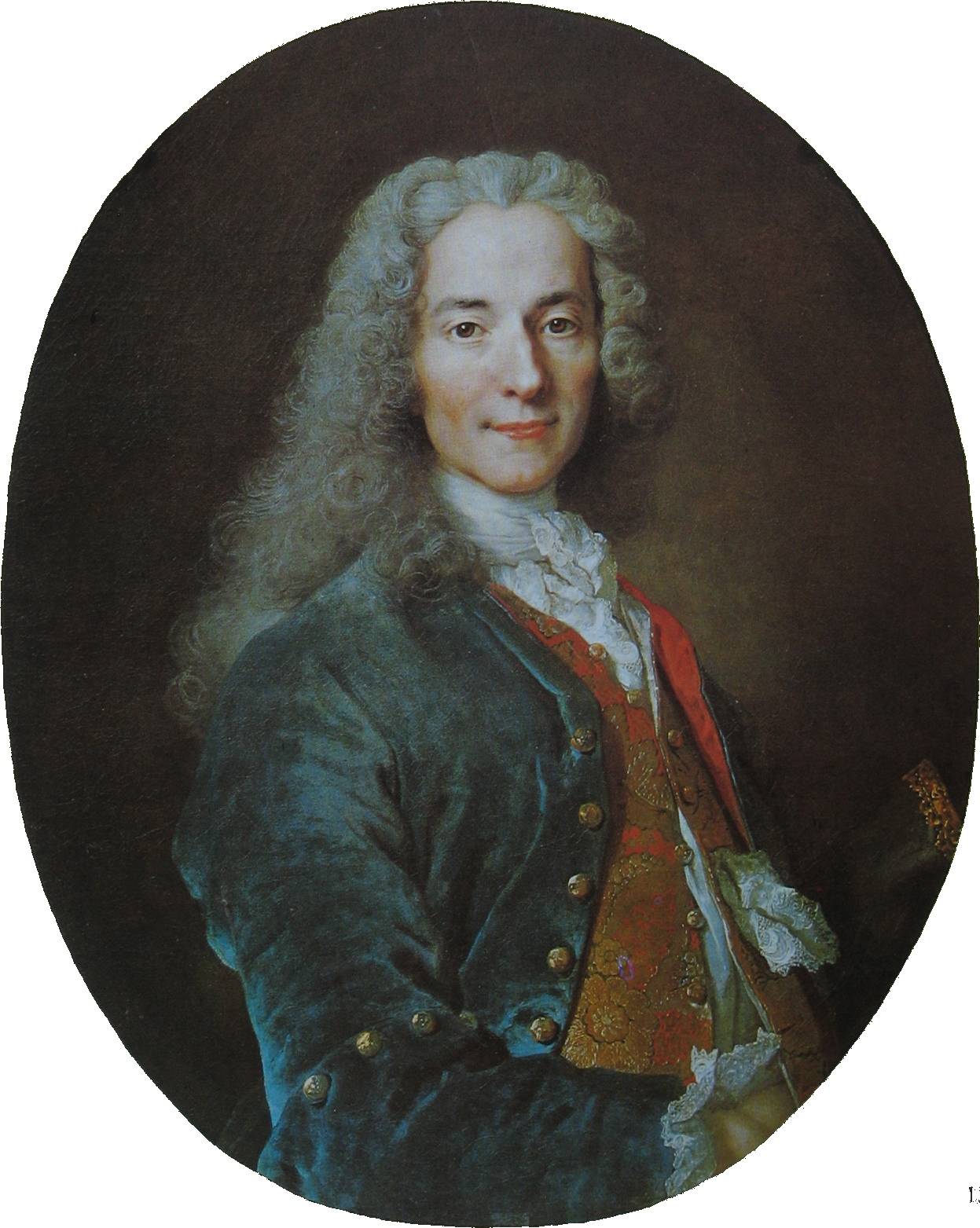
Voltaire in 1724–25, spent most of his career in exile far from Pari, but returned to the city to die

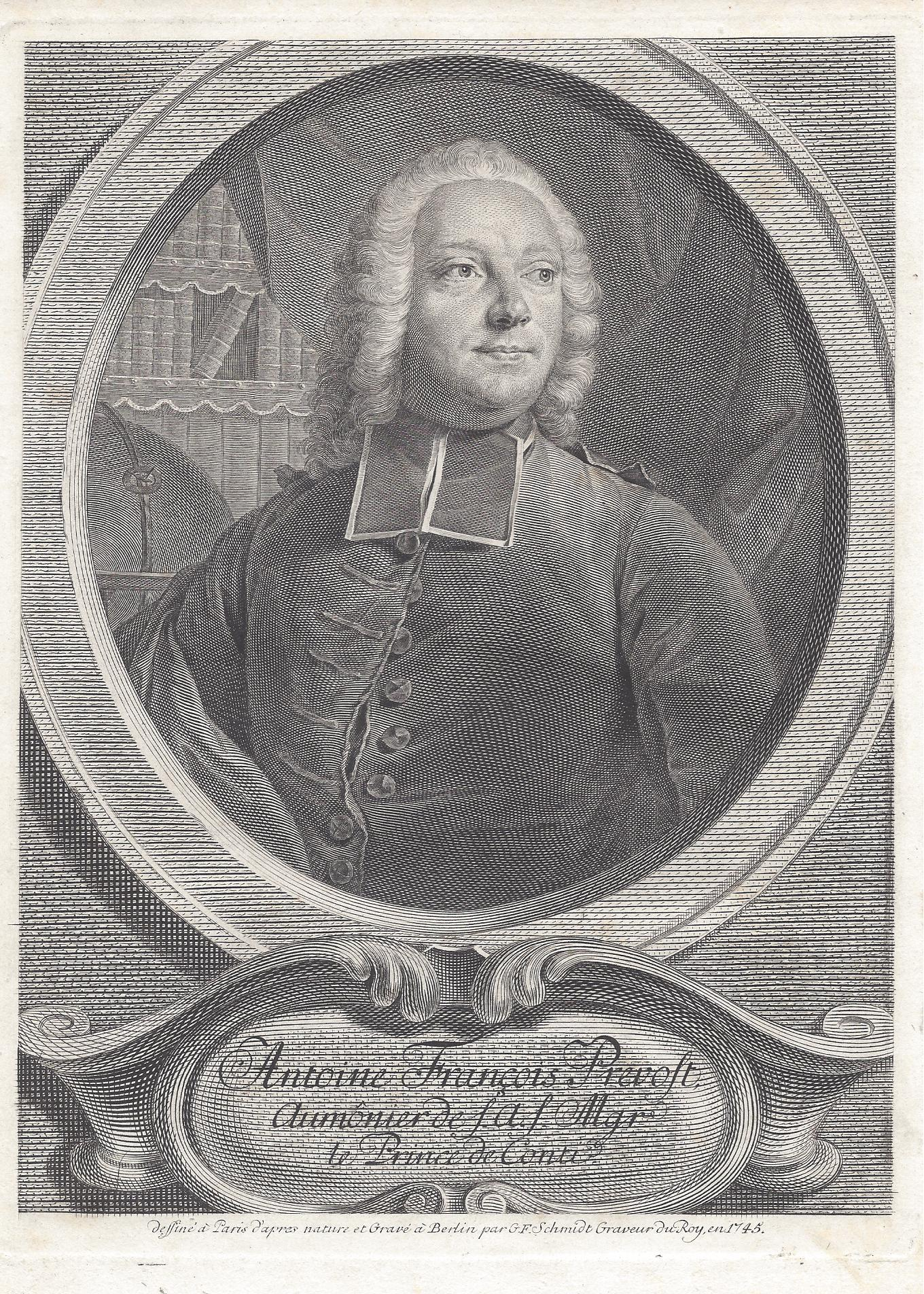
Antoine François Prévost, the author of Manon Lescaut (1731)

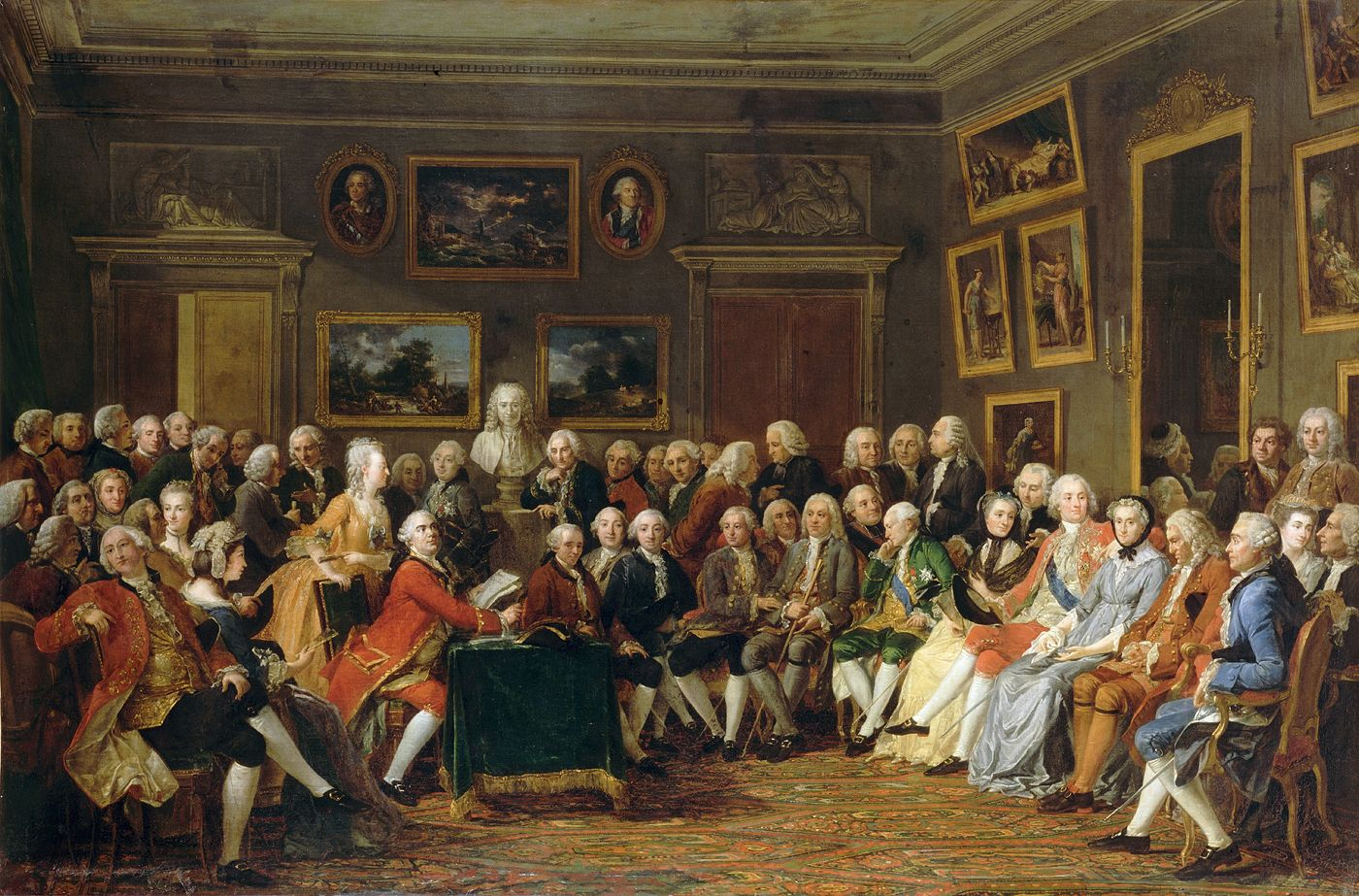
In the Salon of Madame Geoffrin in 1755 by Anicet Charles Gabriel Lemonnier. A reading of a work by Voltaire in the salon of Madame Geoffrin.

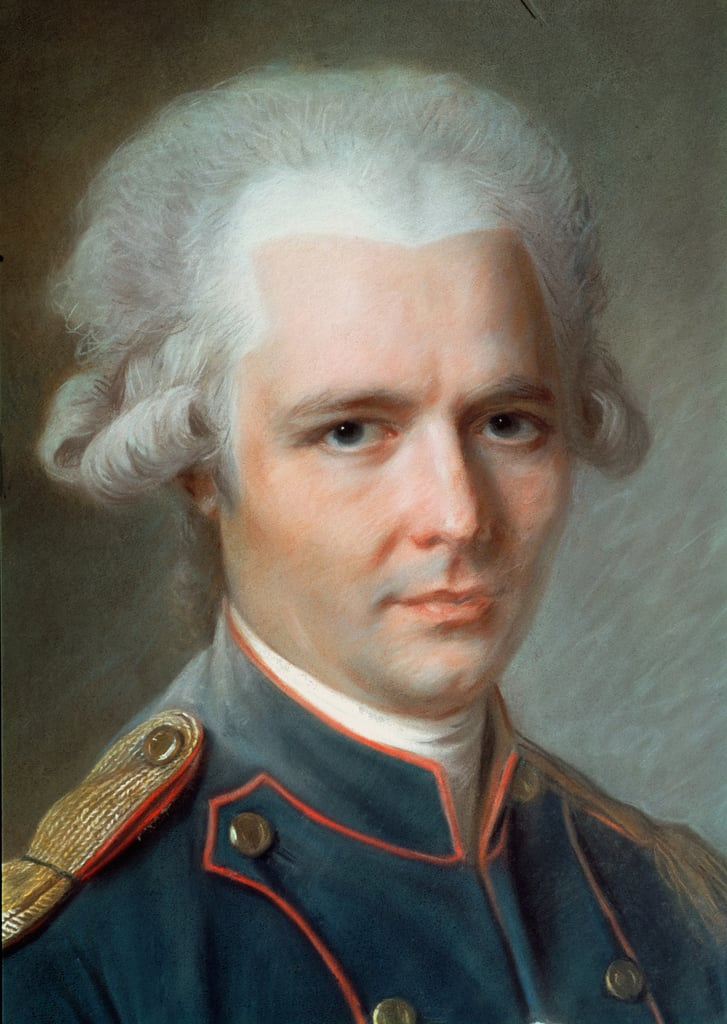
Pierre Choderlos de Laclos, author of Liaisons Dangereuses

Of the great French writers of the 18th century, the two most famous, Voltaire and Jean-Jacques Rousseau, spent most of their careers far from Paris, either in exile or under strict censorship. Early in his career Voltaire had been welcomed to the salon of Madame de Pompadour, and had been granted a government pension, which he did not touch for twelve years; the scholar and co-author of the first Encyclopedia, d'Alembert had been provided an apartment in the Louvre; and Rousseau had been feted and welcomed to the homes of the nobility. But under Louis XVI the royal attitudes changed. Voltaire very rarely visited Paris between 1760 and his death in 1784. Rousseau was allowed to return to Paris from exile only on the condition that he not publish any of his work. Nonetheless, the writing of both men was widely read, usually in clandestine editions, and shaped the ideas that led to the Revolution.

In the first half of the 18th century, eminent French writers were invited to become members of the Académie Française, but the academy in practice served largely to glorify the royal family and to keep writers under gentle control, rather to stimulate innovation in literature. Neither Rousseau nor Voltaire were chosen; only one of the great Philosophes of the enlightenment, Montesquieu, was elected a member. His 1748 book The Spirit of the Laws, proposing a separation of powers between the executive, legislature and courts, had an enormous impact on political thinking outside France, especially in England and the United States.

Despite censorship and restrictions, Paris was the leading book-publishing center of Europe, and provided books not only to France, but exported them to all the courts and aristocracies of Europe, where French was widely spoken. The plays of Voltaire, Pierre Beaumarchais and Pierre de Marivaux; the novels of Choderlos de Laclos (Les Liaisons dangereuses), Antoine François Prévost (Manon Lescaut) and the poetry of Jacques Delille and Évariste de Parny were read in all the major cities of the continent, as far away as Saint Petersburg.

An important feature of the Paris literary world was the literary salon, where wives of the nobility invited their friends to their homes to hear readings of new books and to discuss literature, and, later in the century, politics. The first famous Paris salon of the 18th century was that of Madame de Lambert in her town house on rue Richelieu in 1710, followed by those of Madames de Tencin, Geoffrin, Du Deffand, d'Épinay, Helvétius, and Necker. The Revolution brought an abrupt end to the literary salons, as the aristocrats were executed or forced into exile, and some of the most promising writers, including the poet André Chenier, went to the guillotine.

The period of the French Revolution (1789–1799) was not a good time for French literature. The most important poet, André Chenier, was sent to the guillotine during the Reign of Terror. His poems did not become well known until after the Revolution. The Marquis de Sade had been imprisoned even before the Revolution for his scandalous writing. He was released during the French Directory, but under Napoleon he was sent to an insane asylum, where he died.

== Under Napoleon (1799–1815) ==
Freedom of the press had been proclaimed at the beginning of the Revolution, but had quickly disappeared during the Reign of Terror, and was not restored by the succeeding governments or by Napoleon. In 1809, Napoleon told his Council of State: "The printing presses are an arsenal, and should not be put at the disposition of anyone...The right to publish is not a natural right; printing as a form of instruction is a public function, and therefore the State can prevent it." Supervision of the press was the responsibility of the Ministry of the Police, which had separate bureaus to oversee newspapers, plays, publishers and printers, and bookstores. The Prefecture of Police had its own bureau which also kept an eye on printers, bookstores and newspapers. All books published had to be approved by the censors, and between 1800 and 1810 one-hundred sixty titles were banned and seized by the police. The number of bookstores in Paris dropped from 340 in 1789 to 302 in 1812; in 1811 the number of publishing houses was limited by law to no more than eighty, almost all in the neighborhood around the university.

Censorship of newspapers and magazines was even stricter. in 1800 Napoleon closed down sixty political newspapers, leaving just thirteen. In February 1811 he decided that this was still too many, and reduced the number to just eight newspapers, almost supporting him. One relatively independent paper, the Journal de l'Empire continued to exist, and by 1812 was the most popular newspaper, with 32,000 subscriptions. Newspapers were also heavily taxed, and subscriptions were expensive; an annual subscription cost about 56 francs in 1814. Because of the high cost of newspapers, many Parisians went to cabinets litteraires or reading salons, which numbered about one hundred and fifty. For a subscription of about six francs a month, readers could find a selection of newspapers, plus billiards, cards or chess games. Some salons displayed caricatures of the leading figures of the day.

== The Restoration (1815–1830) ==
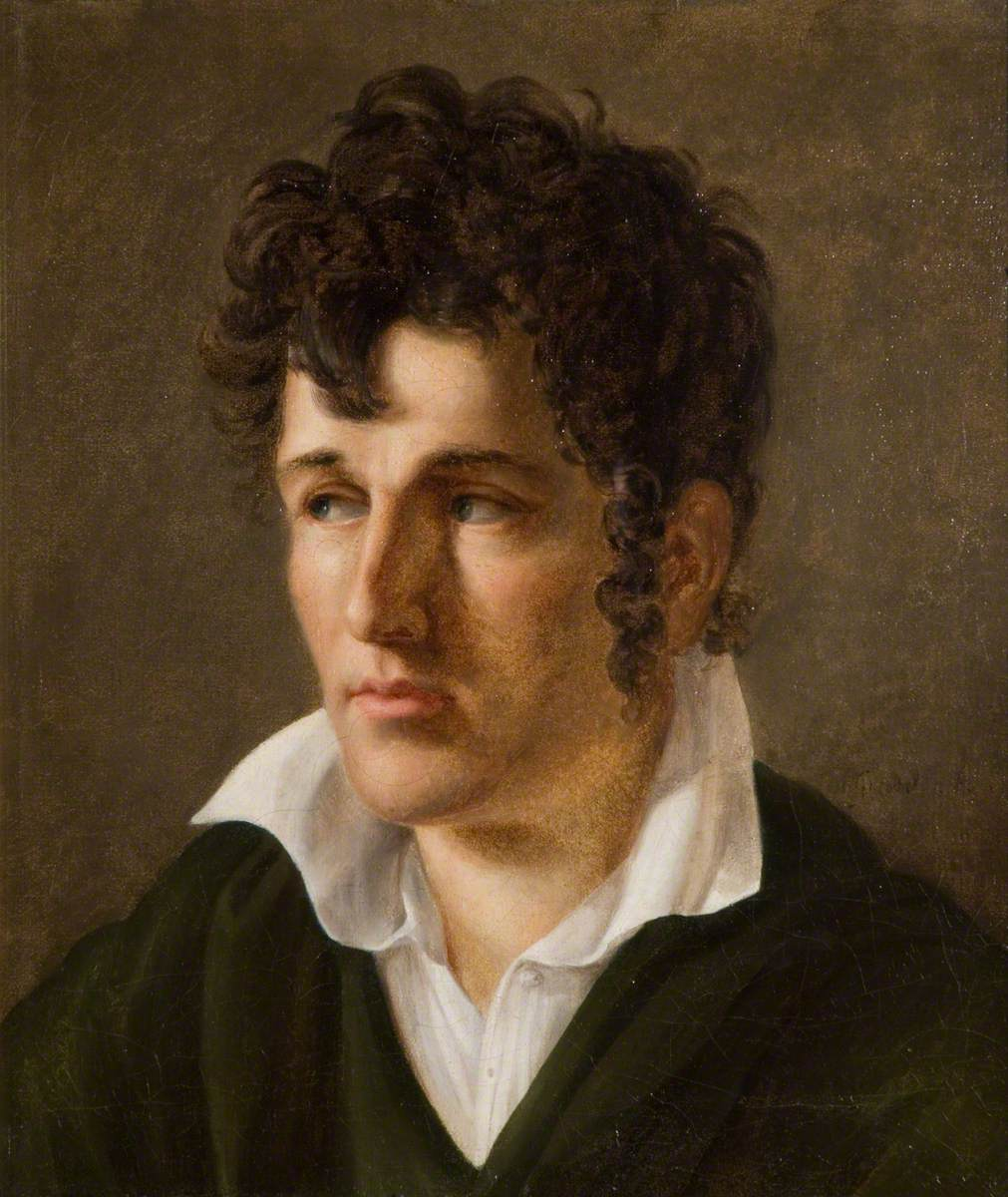
François-René de Chateaubriand

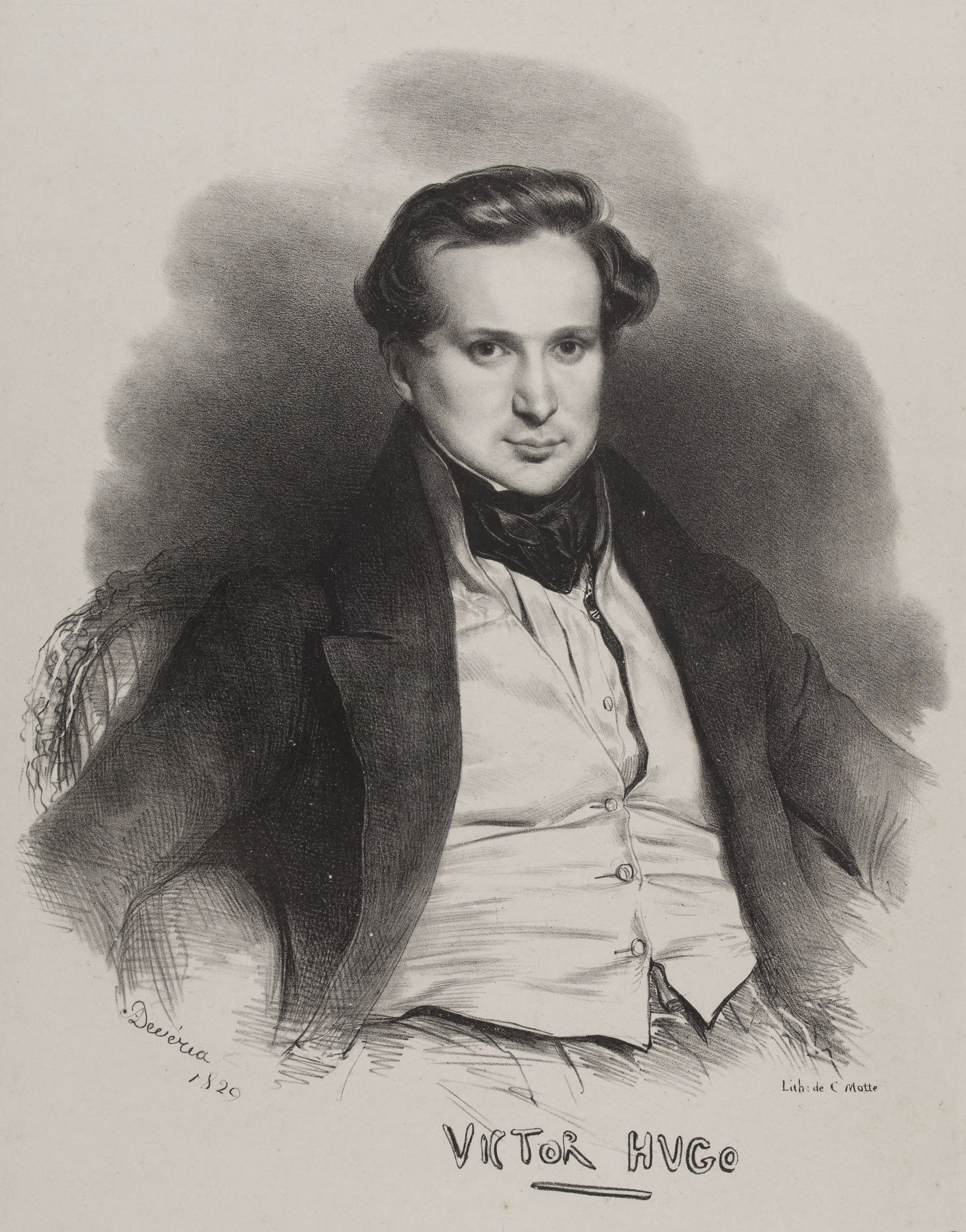
Victor Hugo in 1829

The dominant literary movement in Paris was romanticism, and the most prominent romantic was François-René de Chateaubriand, an essayist and diplomat. He began the Restoration as a committed defender of the Catholic faith and royalist, but gradually moved into the liberal opposition and became a fervent supporter of freedom of speech. The prominent romantics of the time included the poet and politician Alphonse de Lamartine, Gérard de Nerval, Alfred de Musset, Théophile Gautier, and Prosper Mérimée.

Despite limitations on press freedom, the Restoration was an extraordinary rich period for French literature. Paris editors published the first works of some of France's most famous writers. Honoré de Balzac moved to Paris in 1814, studied at the University of Paris, wrote his first play in 1820, and published his first novel, Les Chouans, in 1829. Alexandre Dumas moved to Paris in 1822, and found a position working for the future King, Louis-Philippe, at the Palais-Royal. In 1829, At the age of 27, he published his first play, Henri III and his Courts. Stendhal, a pioneer of literary realism, published his first novel, The Red and the Black, in 1830.

The young Victor Hugo declared that he wanted to be "Chateaubriand or nothing". His first book of poems, published in 1822 when he was twenty years old, earned him a royal prize from Louis XVIII. His second book of poems in 1826 established him as one of France's leading poets. He wrote his first plays, Cromwell and Hernani in 1827 and 1830, and his first short novel, The Last Days of a Condemned Man, in 1829. The premiere of the ultra-romantic Hernani (see theater section below) caused a riot in the audience.

== The July Monarchy (1830–1848) ==
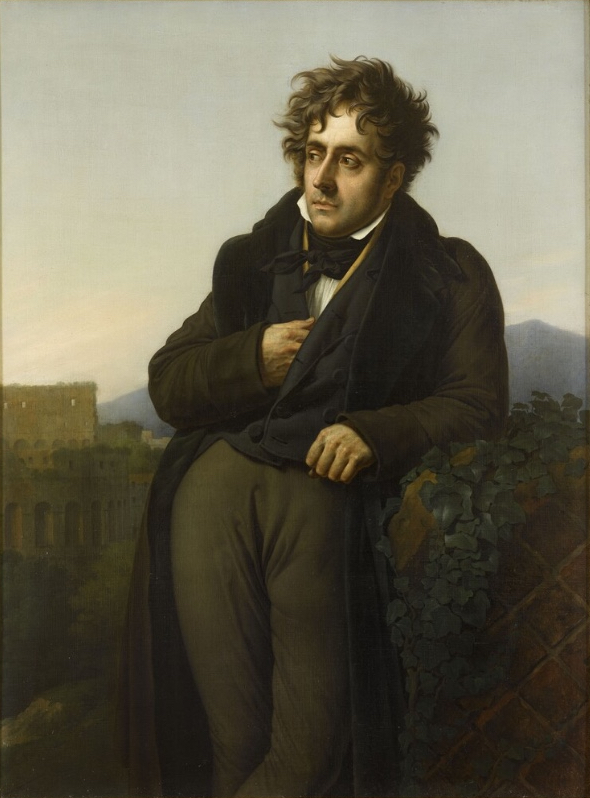
Chateaubriand (1820s)

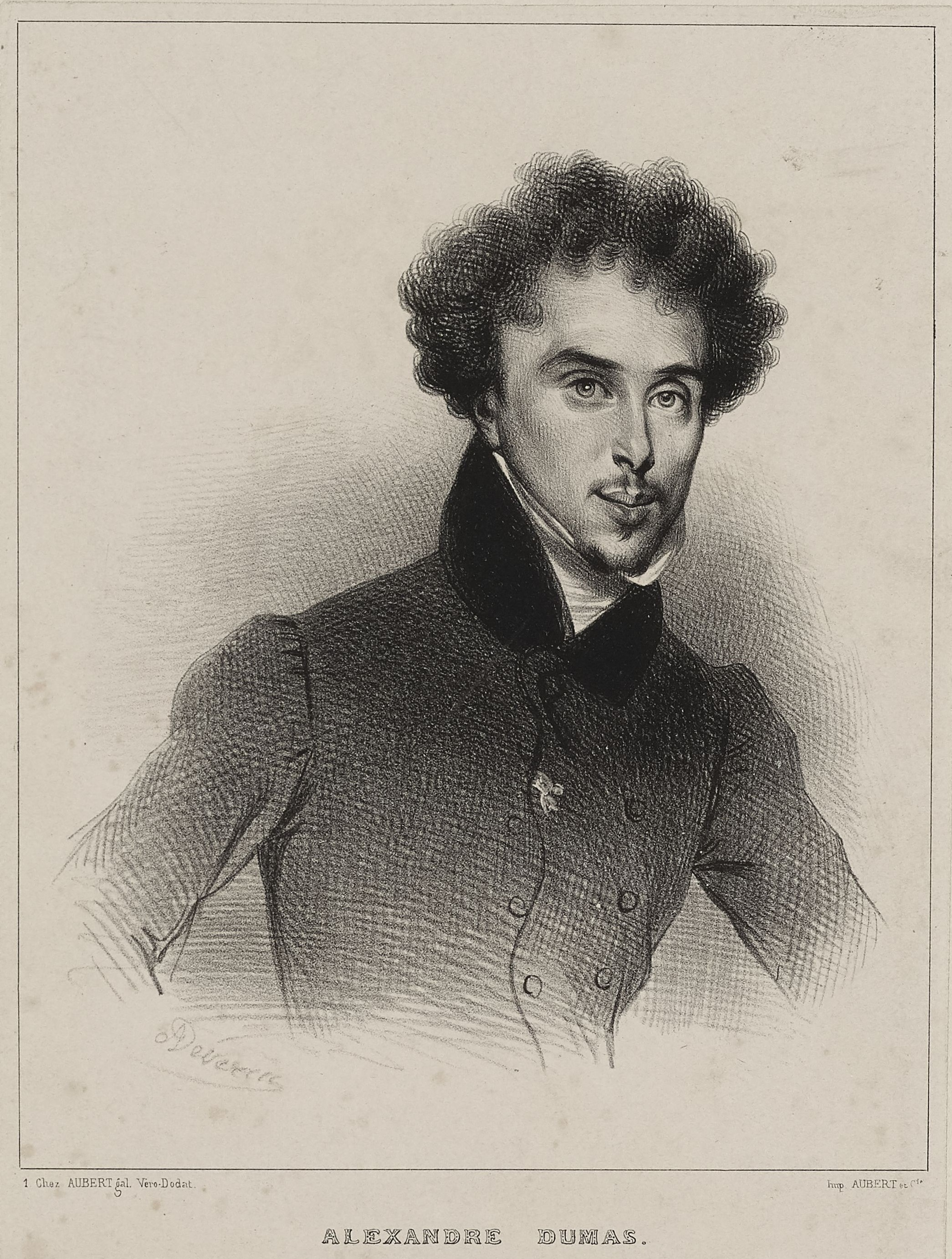
Alexandre Dumas (1832)

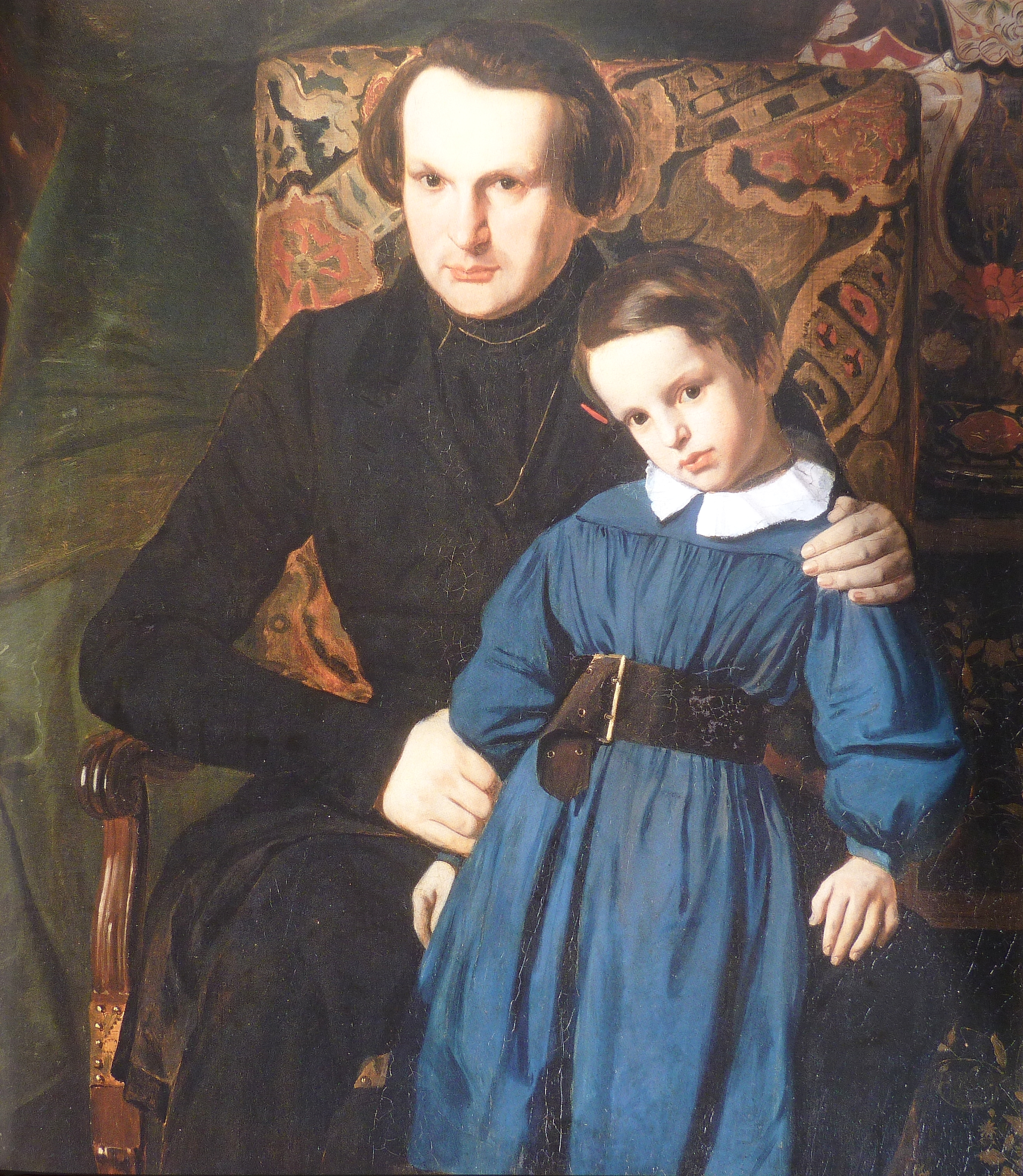
Victor Hugo and his son François-Victor (1836)

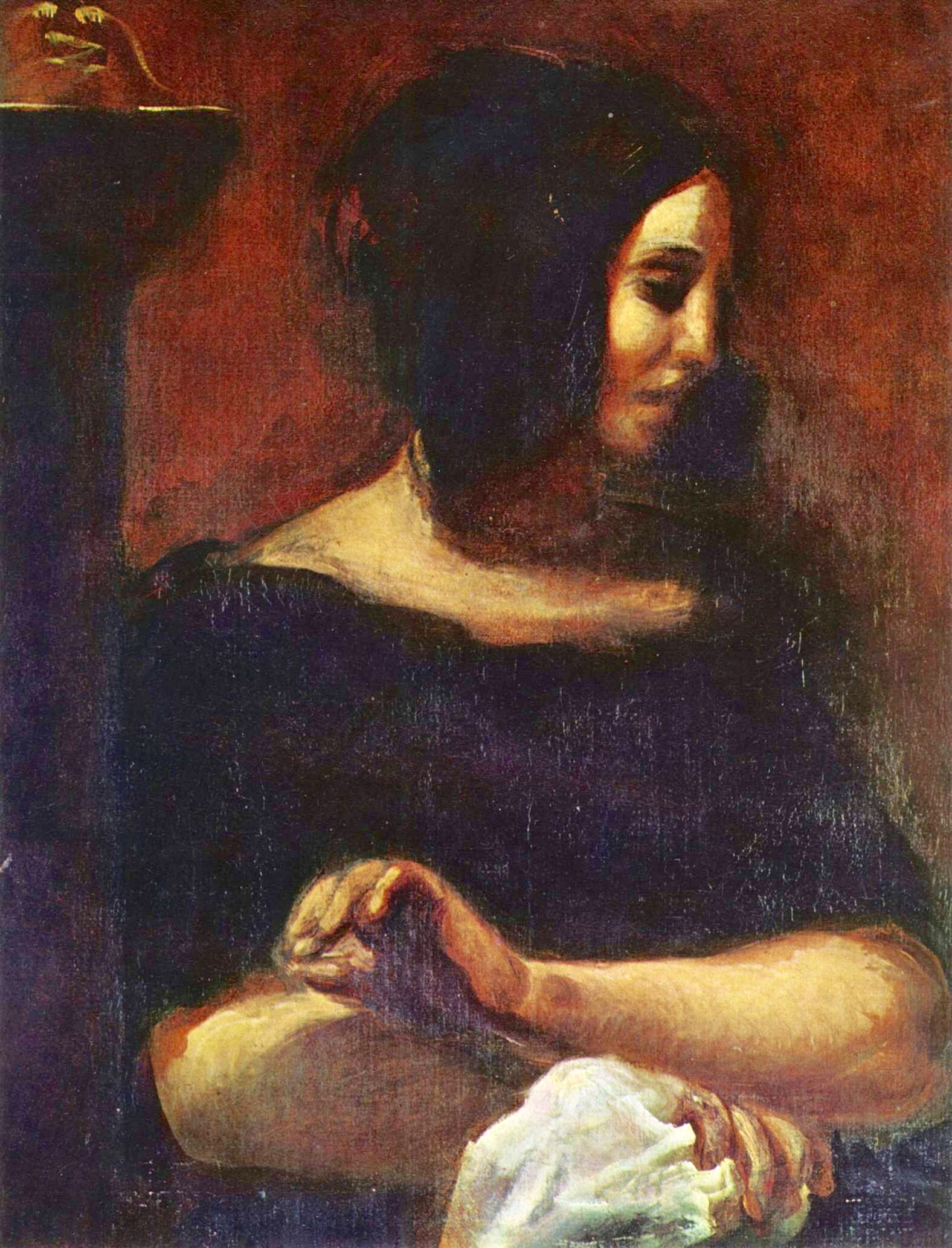
George Sand by Eugène Delacroix (1837)

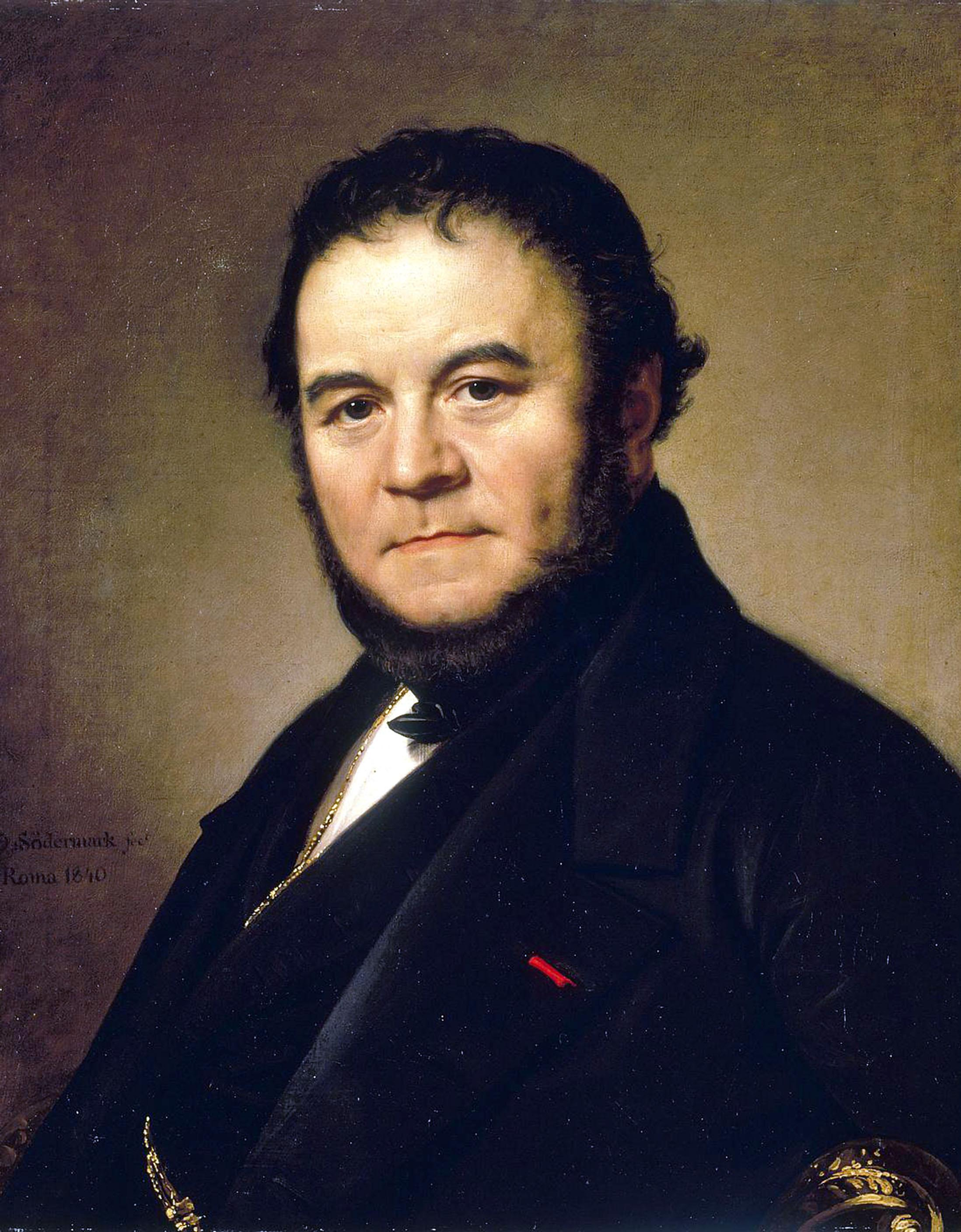
Stendhal (1840)

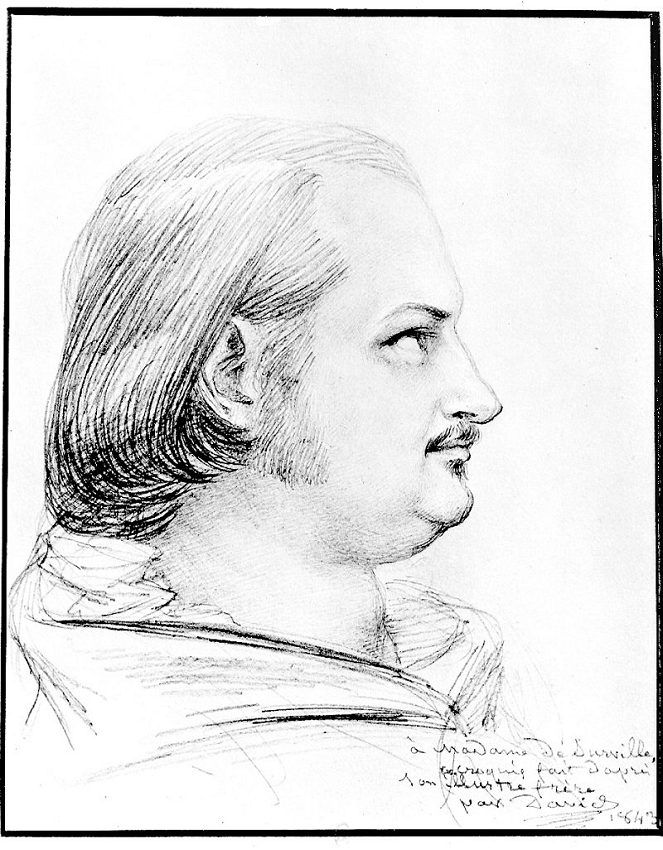
Honoré de Balzac (1843)

Many of the greatest and most popular works of French literature were written and published in Paris during the July Monarchy.

- Victor Hugo published four volumes of poetry, and in 1831 published Notre-Dame de Paris (The Hunchback of Notre-Dame), which was quickly translated into English and other European languages. The novel led to the restoration of the cathedral and other medieval monuments in Paris. In 1841, Louis-Philippe made Hugo a peer of France, a ceremonial position with a seat in the upper house of the French parliament. Hugo spoke out against the death penalty and for freedom of speech. While living in his house on the Place Royale (now Place des Vosges), he began working on his next novel, Les Misérables.
- François-René de Chateaubriand refused to swear allegiance to Louis-Philippe, and instead secluded himself in his apartment at 120 Rue du Bac and wrote his most famous work, Mémoires d'outre-tombe, which was not published until after his death. He died in Paris on 4 July 1848, during the French Revolution of 1848.
- After writing several novels, in 1832 Honoré de Balzac conceived the idea of a series of books that would paint a panoramic portrait of "all aspects of society;" eventually called La Comédie Humaine. He declared to his sister, "I am about to become a genius." He published Eugénie Grandet, his first bestseller, in 1833, followed by Le Père Goriot in 1835, the two-volume Illusions perdues in 1843, Splendeurs et misères des courtisanes in 1847, Le Cousin Pons (1847) and La Cousine Bette (1848). In each of the novels, Paris is the setting and a major participant.
- During the July Monarchy, the highly prolific Alexandre Dumas published The Three Musketeers (1844); Twenty Years After (1845); The Vicomte de Bragelonne (1847); The Count of Monte Cristo (1845–1846); La Reine Margot (1845); La Dame de Monsoreau (1846); and many more novels, in addition to many theatrical versions of his novels for the Paris stage.
- Stendhal published his first major novel, Le Rouge et le Noir, in 1830, and his second, La Chartreuse de Parme, in 1839.

Other major Paris writers of the July Monarchy included George Sand, Alfred de Musset, and Alphonse de Lamartine. The poet Charles Baudelaire, born in Paris, published his first works, essays of art criticism.

== The Second Republic and Second Empire (1848–1870) ==
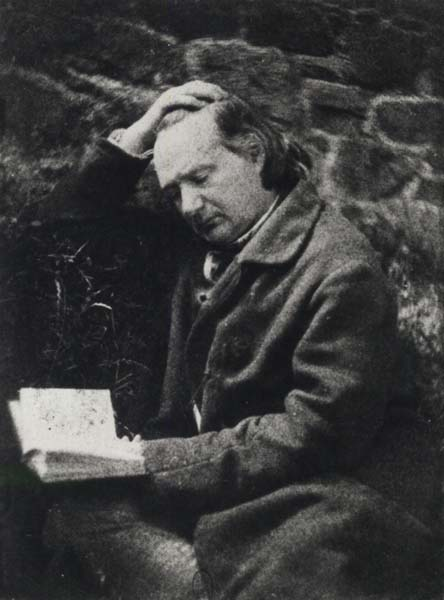
Victor Hugo was in exile on the island of Jersey during almost all of the Second Empire, but his works, including Les Miserables in 1862, were immensely popular in Paris.

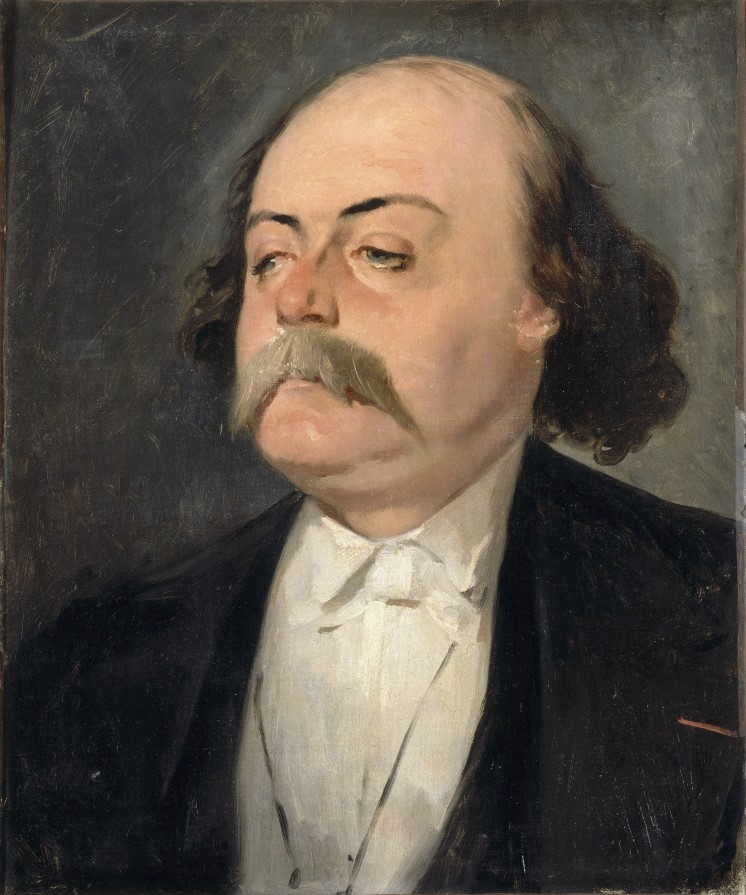
Gustave Flaubert (1821-1880) published Madame Bovary in 1866, and was charged with immorality. He was acquitted, and the publicity made the novel a huge public success.

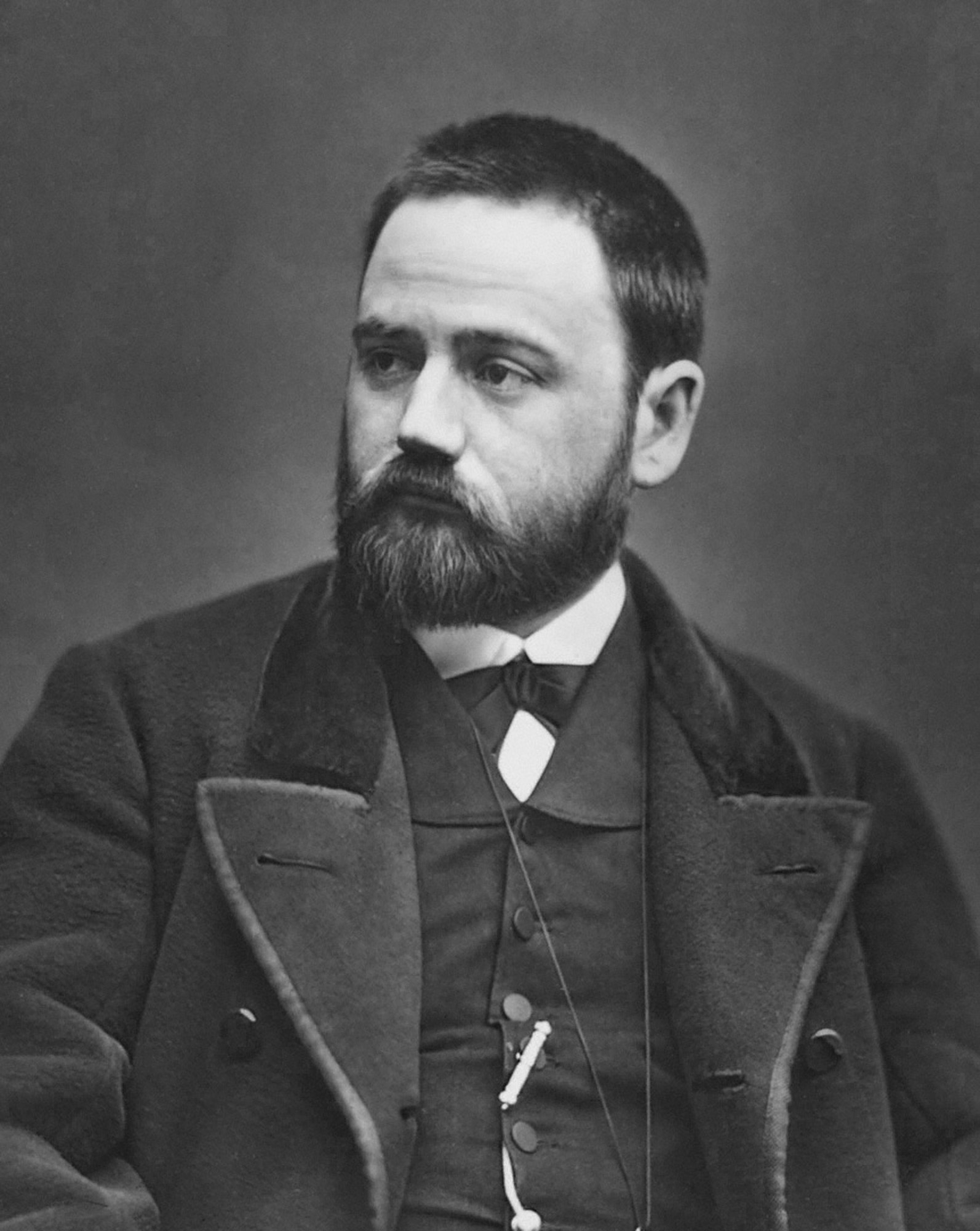
Émile Zola (1840-1902) began his literary career as a shipping clerk for the Paris publisher Hachette. He published his first major novel, Thérèse Raquin, in 1867.

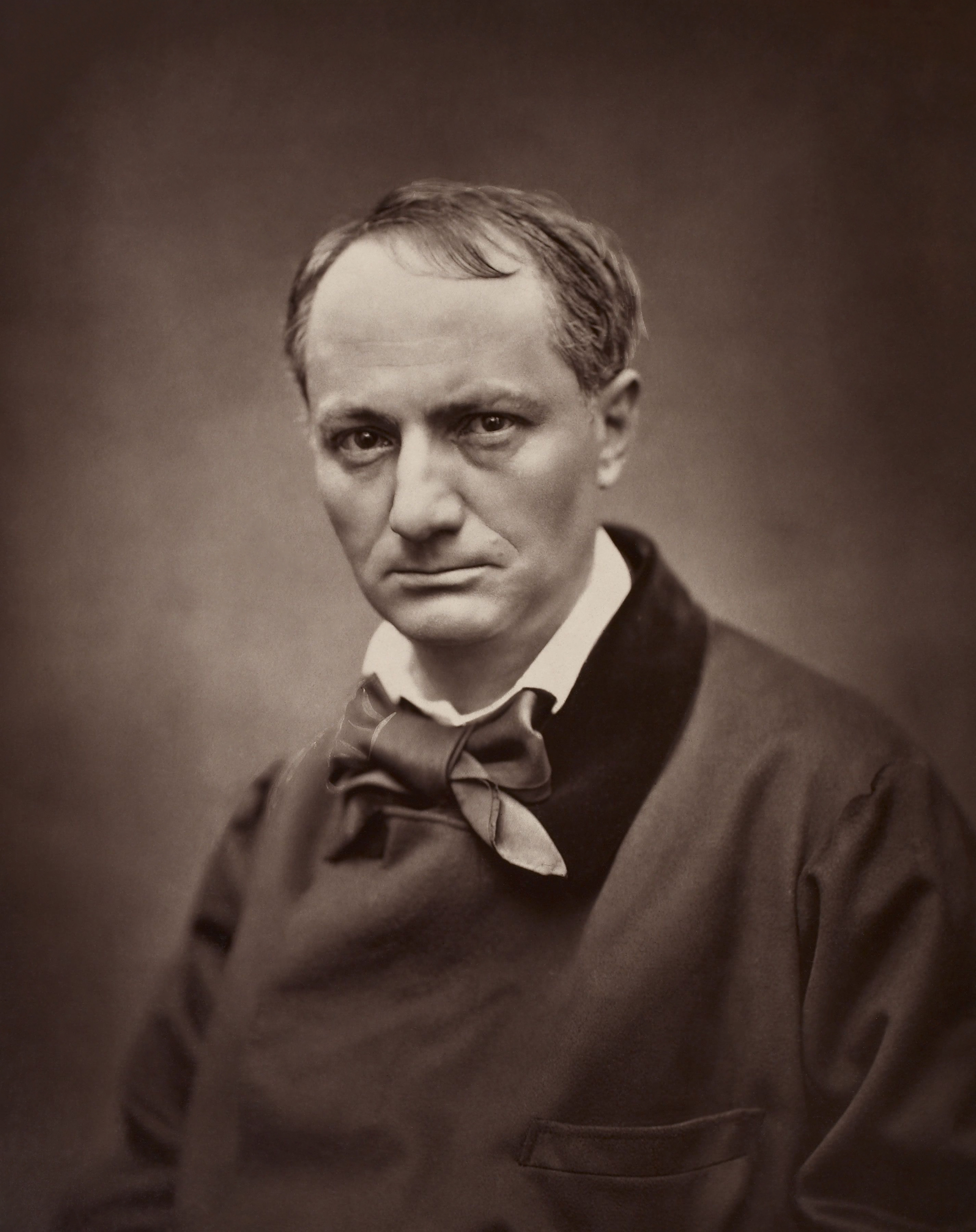
The poet Charles Baudelaire (1821-1867) also faced charges of an offending public morality with his poems. He was fined and six poems were suppressed.

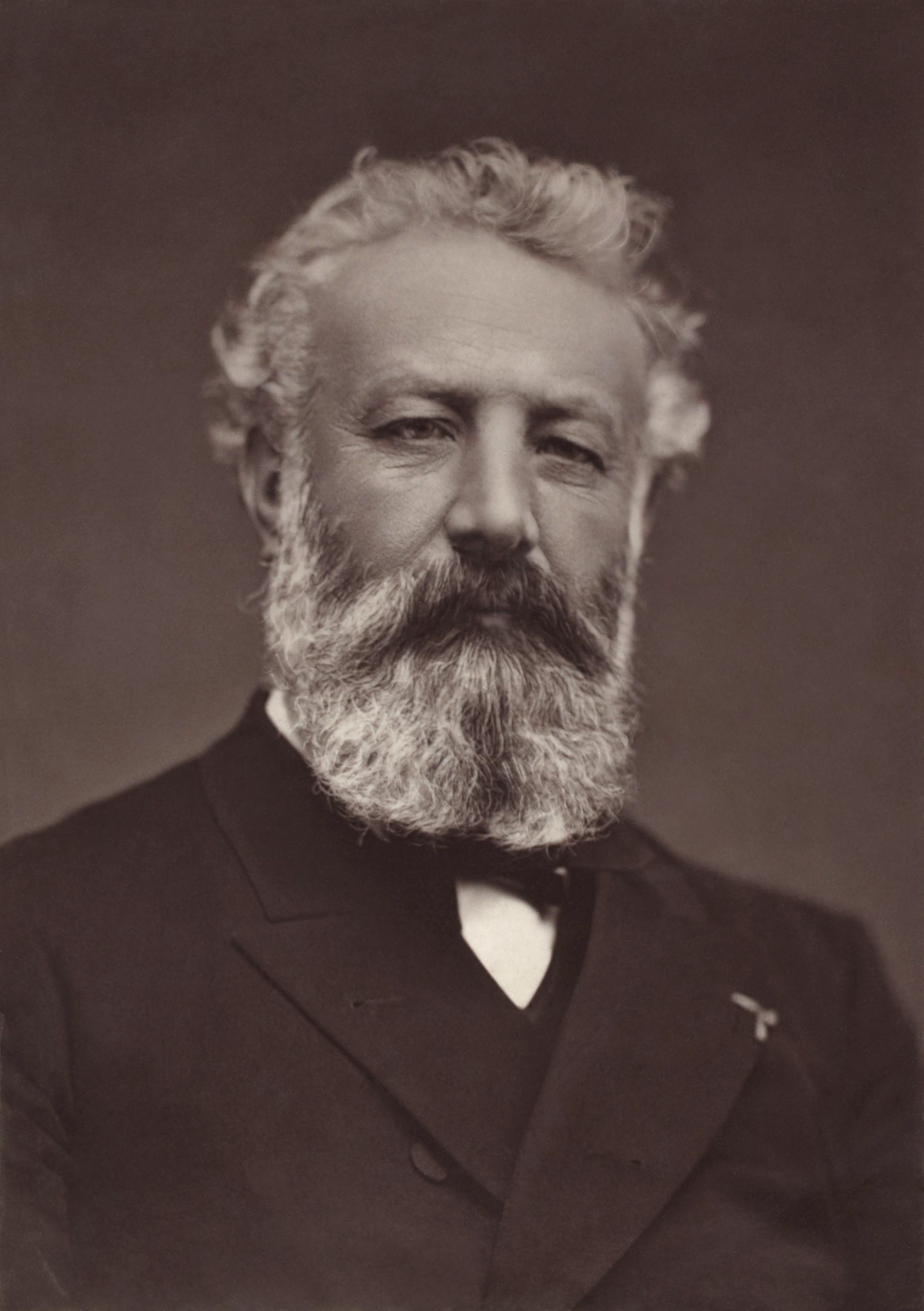
Jules Verne (1828-1905) worked at the Theatre Lyrique and at the stock market, and did research for his first stories at the National Library.

The most famous Paris writer of the Second Empire, Victor Hugo, spent only a few days in the city during the course of the Empire. He was exiled shortly after Napoleon III seized power in 1852, and he did not return until after the fall of Napoleon III. The Emperor stated publicly that Hugo could return whenever he wanted, but Hugo refused on a matter of principle, and while in exile wrote books and articles ridiculing and denouncing Napoleon III. His novel Les Misérables was published in Paris in April and May 1862, and was a huge popular success, though it was criticized by Gustave Flaubert who said he found "no truth or greatness in it."

Alexandre Dumas (1802–1870) left Paris in 1851, just before the Empire, partly because of political differences with Napoleon III, who was then Prince-President, but largely because he was deeply in debt and wanted to avoid creditors. After travelling to Belgium, Italy and Russia, he returned to Paris in 1864 and wrote his last major work, The Knight of Sainte-Hermine, before he died in 1870.

The son of Dumas, Alexandre Dumas fils (1824–1895), became the most successful playwright of the Second Empire. His 1852 drama The Lady of the Camellias ran for one hundred performances, and was adapted by Giuseppe Verdi into the opera La Traviata in 1853.

After Victor Hugo, he most prominent writer of the Second Empire was Gustave Flaubert (1821–1880). He published his first novel, Madame Bovary, in 1857, and followed it with Sentimental Education and Salammbo in 1869. He and his publisher were charged with immorality for Madame Bovary. Both were acquitted, and the publicity from the trial helped make the novel a notable artistic and commercial success.

The most important poet of the Second Empire was Charles Baudelaire (1821–1867), who published Les fleurs du mal in 1860. He also ran into trouble with the censors, and was charged with an offense to public morality. He was convicted and fined, and six poems were suppressed, but he appealed, the fine was reduced, and the suppressed poems eventually appeared. His work was attacked by the critic of Le Figaro, who complained that "everything in it which is not hideous is incomprehensible", but Baudelaire's work and innovation had an enormous influence on the poets who followed him.

The most prominent of the younger generation of writers in Paris was Émile Zola (1840–1902). His first job in Paris was as a shipping clerk for the publisher Hachette, and later as the director of publicity for the firm. He published his first stories in 1864, his first novel in 1865, and had his first literary success in 1867 with his novel Thérèse Raquin.

Another important writer of the time was Alphonse Daudet (1840–1897), who became private secretary to the half-brother and senior advisor of Napoleon III. His book Lettres de mon moulin in 1866 became a French classic.

One of the most popular writers of the Second Empire was Jules Verne (1828–1905), who lived on what is now Avenue Jules-Verne. He worked at the Theatre Lyrique and the Paris stock exchange, while he did research for his stories at the National Library. he wrote his first stories and novels in Paris, including Journey to the Center of the Earth !(1864), From the Earth to the Moon (1864) and Twenty Thousand Leagues Under the Sea (1865).

== The Belle Epoque (1871–1913) ==
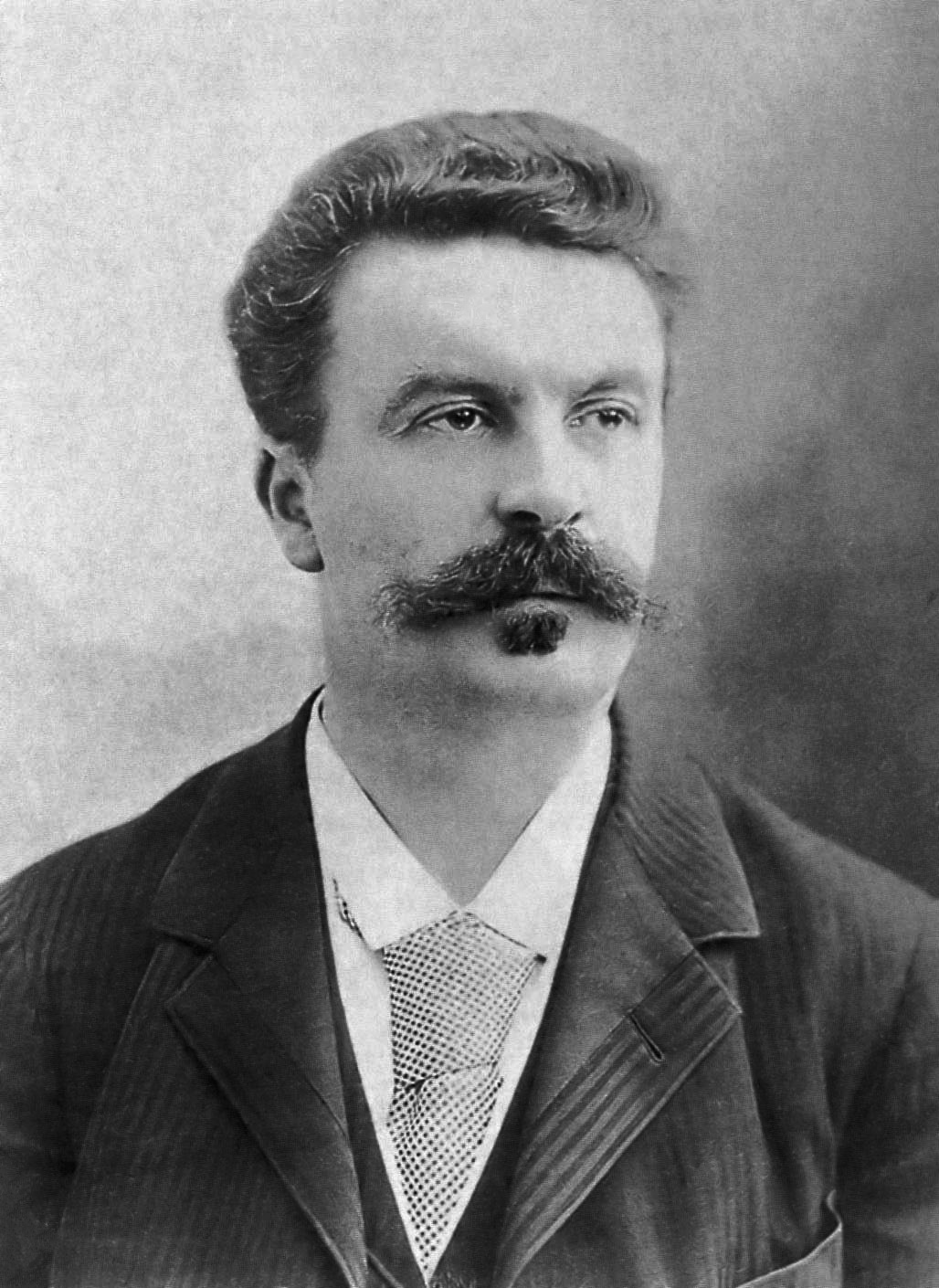
Guy de Maupassant (1888)

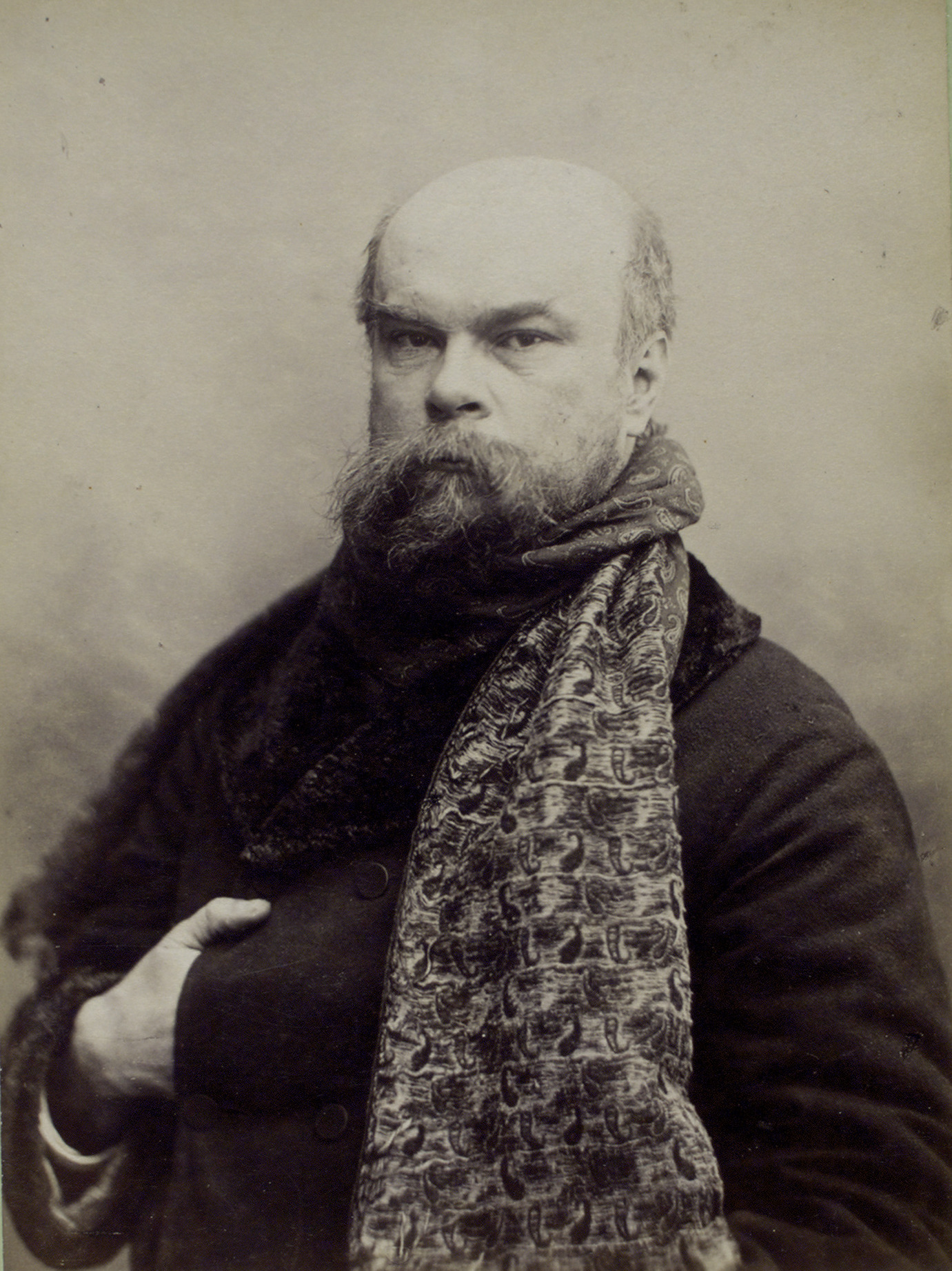
Paul Verlaine (1893)

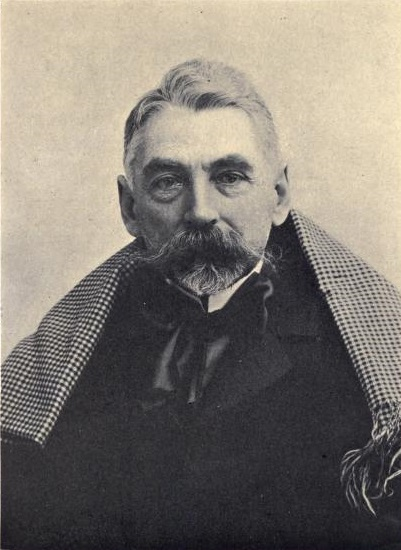
Stéphane Mallarmé (1896)

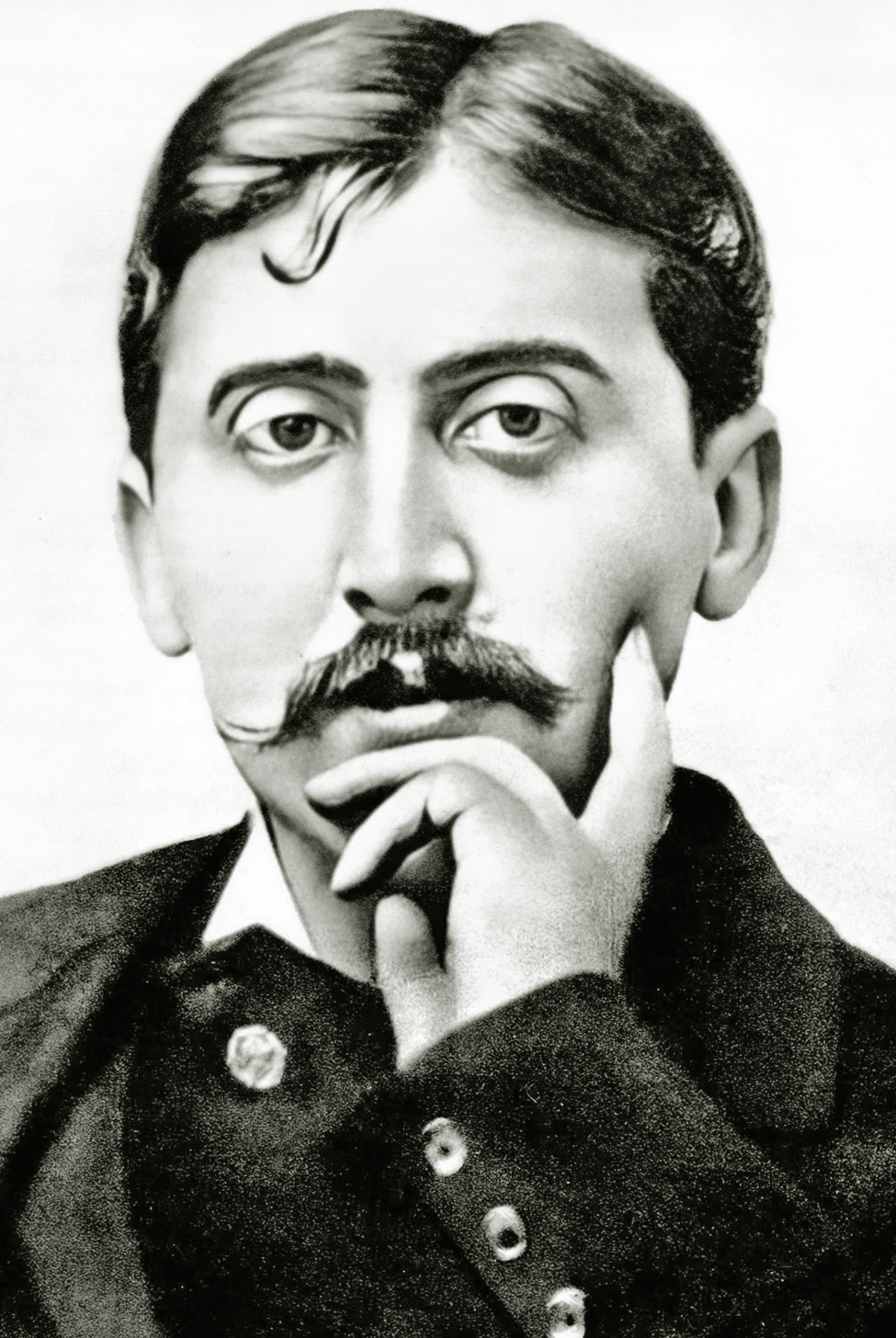
Marcel Proust (1900)

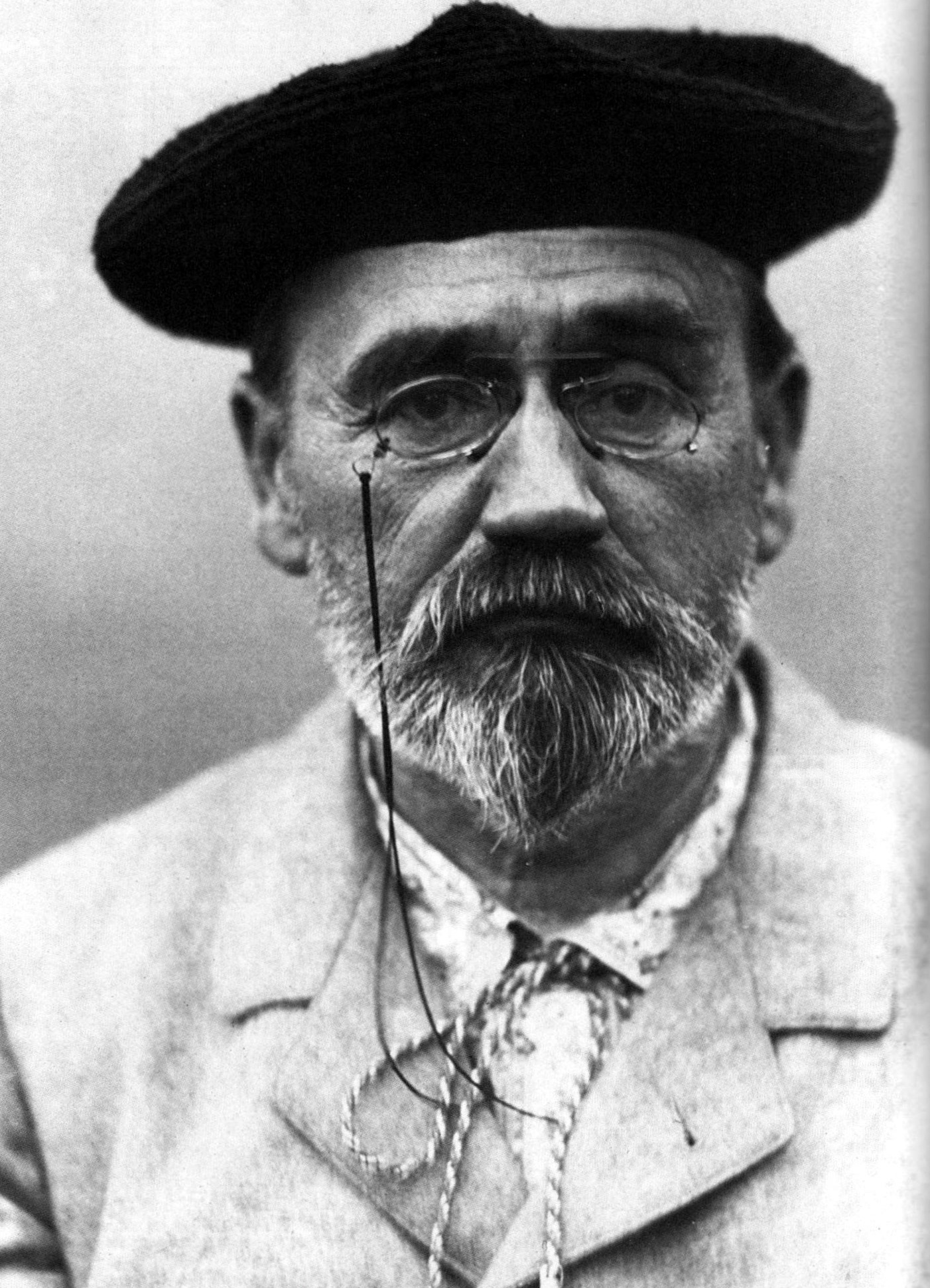
Emile Zola (1902)

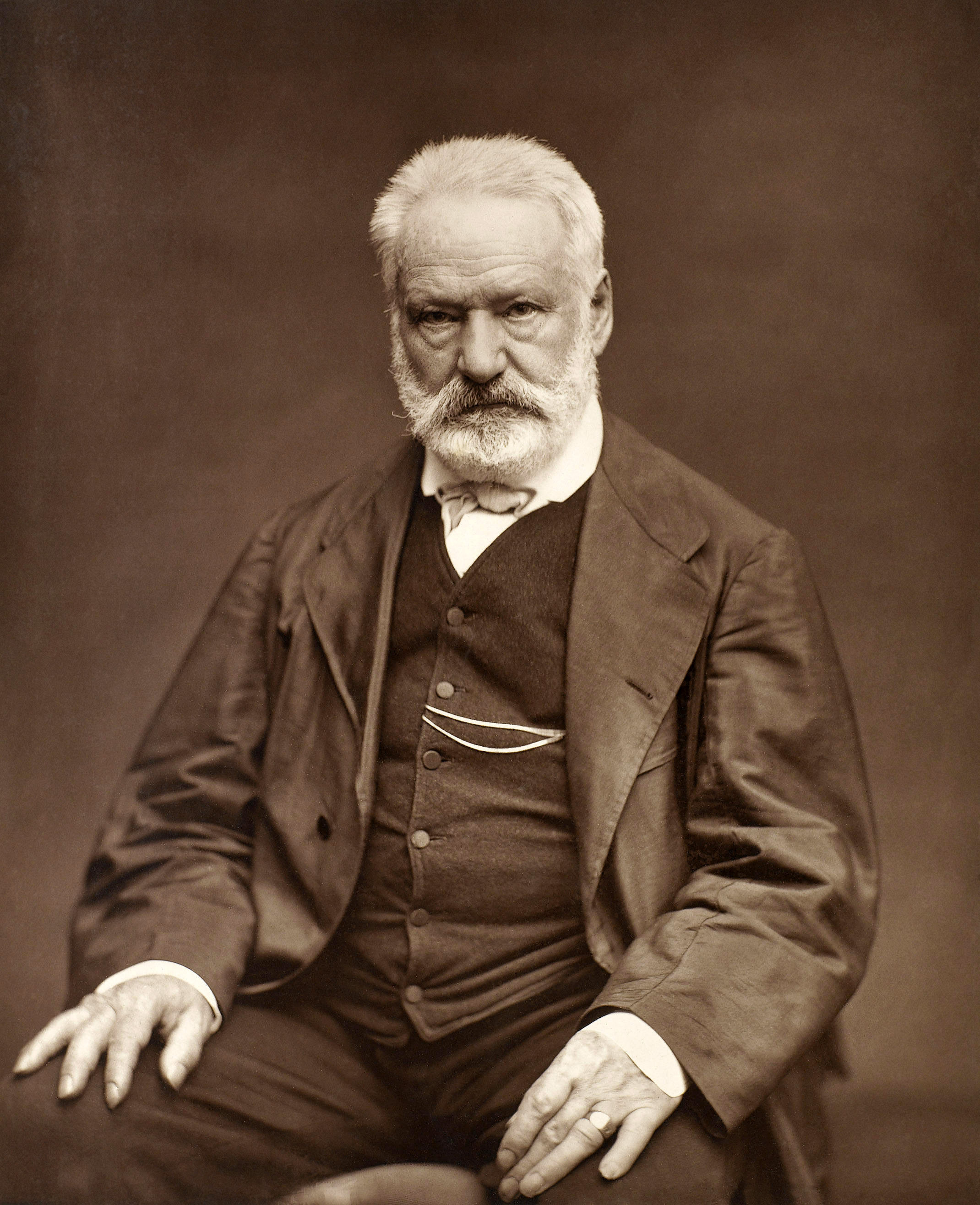
Victor Hugo (1876)

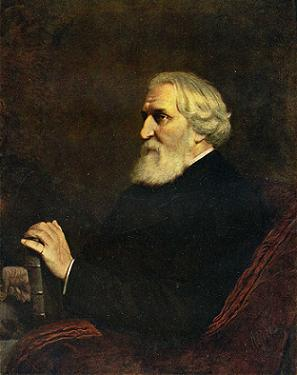
The Russian novelist Ivan Turgenev spent the last years of his life in Paris (1872)

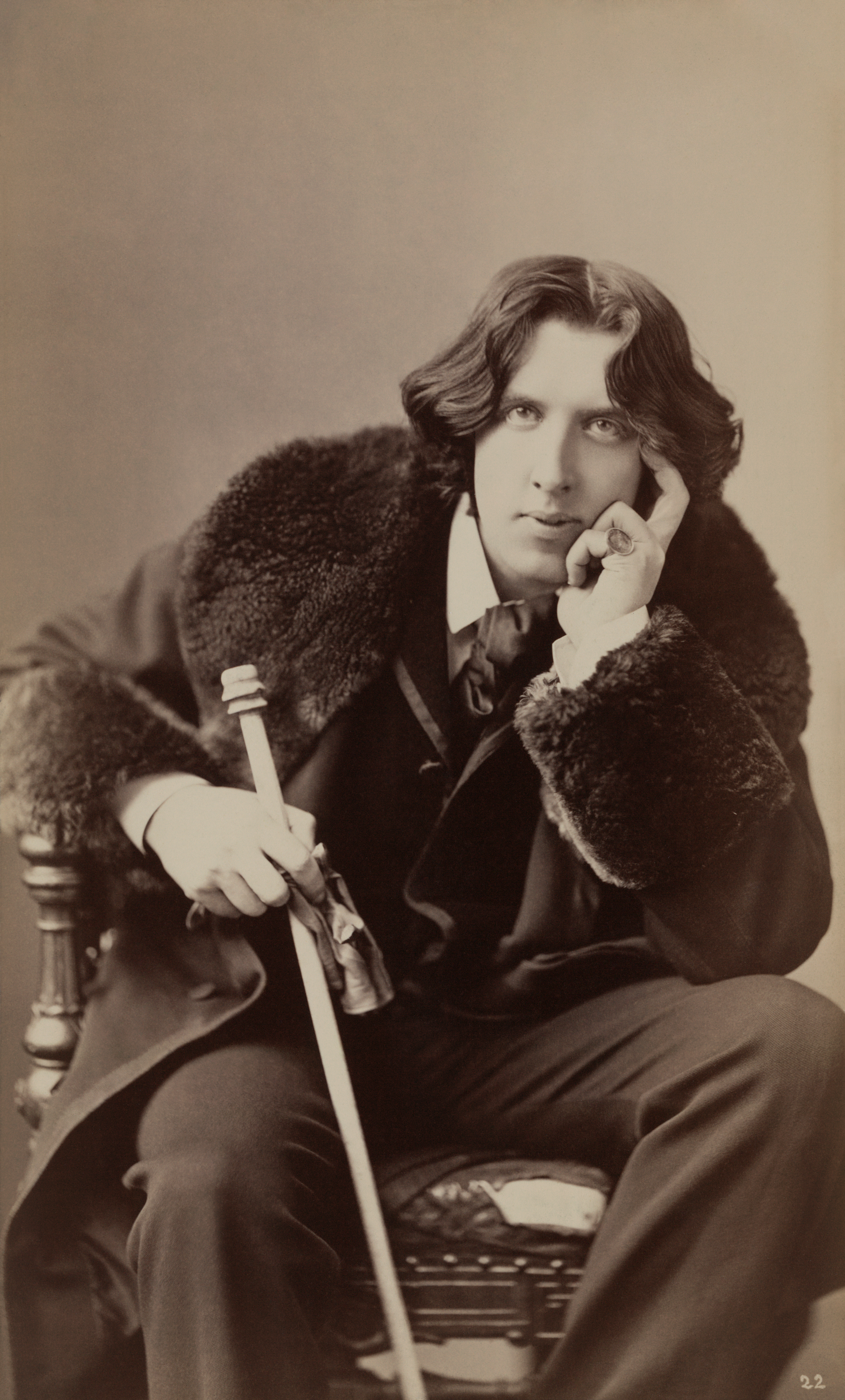
Oscar Wilde died in poverty in Paris in 1900

During the Belle Époque Paris was the home and inspiration for some of France's most famous writers. Victor Hugo was sixty-eight when he returned to Paris from Brussels in 1871 and took up residence on Avenue d'Eylau (now Avenue Victor Hugo) in the 16th arrondissement. He failed to be re-elected to the National Assembly, but in 1876 he was elected to the French Senate. It was a difficult period for Hugo; his daughter Adèle was placed in an insane asylum, and he his longtime mistress, Juliette Drouet, died in 1883. When Hugo died May 28, 1885, at the age of eighty-three, hundreds of thousands of Parisians lined the streets to pay tribute as his coffin was taken to the Panthéon, on 1 June 1885.

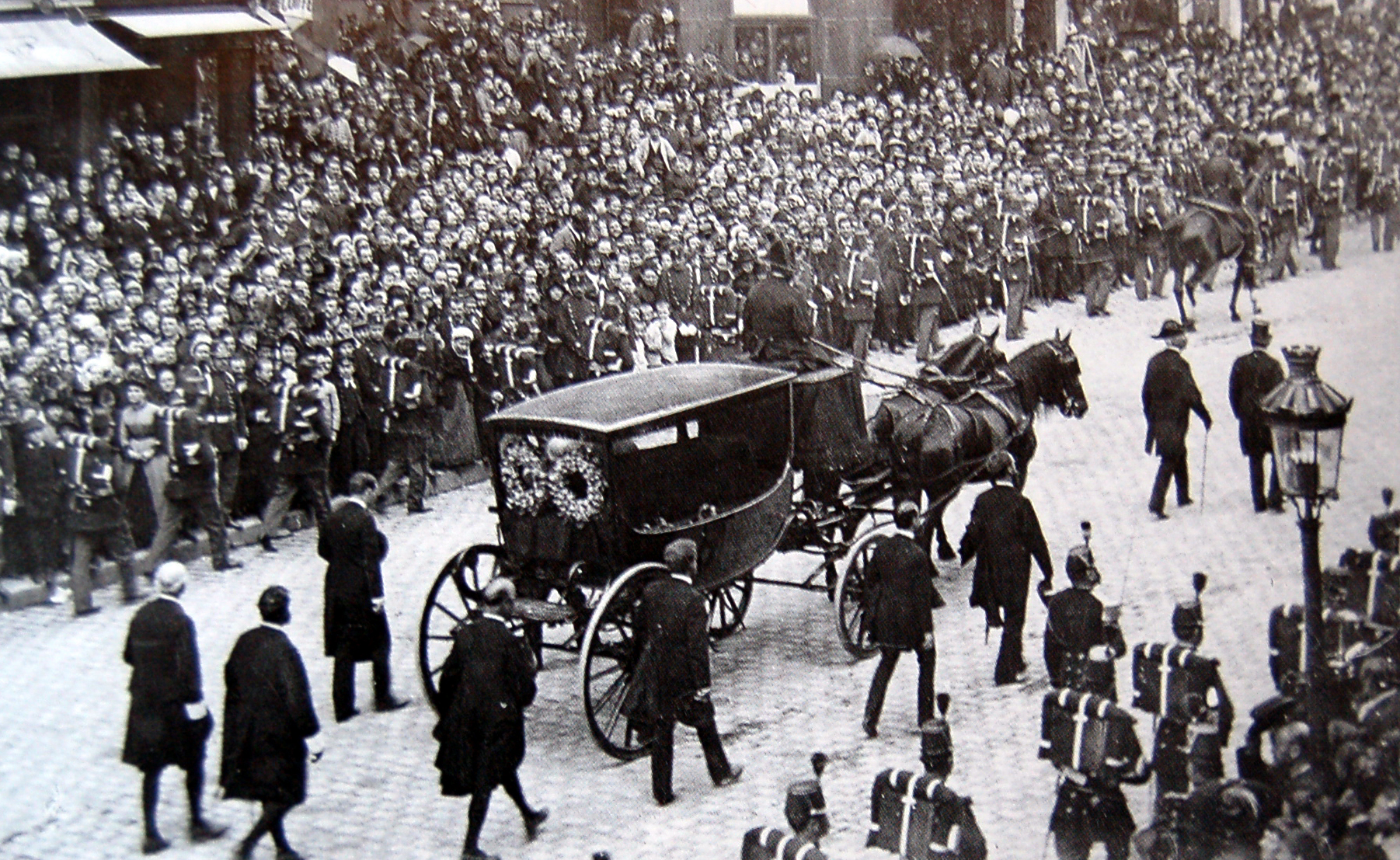
On 1 June 1885, crowds line the streets of Paris as Victor Hugo's remains are taken to the Panthéon.

Émile Zola was born in Paris in 1840, the son of an Italian engineer. He was raised by his mother in Aix-en-Provence, then returned to Paris in 1858 with his friend Paul Cézanne to attempt a literary career. He worked as a mailing clerk for the publisher Hachette, and began attracting literary attention in 1865 with his novels in the new style of naturalism. He described in intimate details the workings of Paris department stores, markets, apartment buildings and other institutions, and the lives of the Parisians. By 1877, he had become famous and wealthy from his writing. He took a central role in the Dreyfus affair, helping win justice for Alfred Dreyfus, a French artillery officer of Alsatian Jewish background, who had falsely been accused of treason.

Guy de Maupassant (1850–1893) moved to Paris in 1881 and worked as a clerk for the French Navy, then for the Ministry of Public Education, as he wrote short stories and novels at a furious pace. He became famous, but also became ill and depressed, then paranoid and suicidal, dying at the asylum of Saint-Esprit in Passy in 1893.

Other writers who made a mark in the Paris literary world of the Third Republic's Belle Époque included Anatole France (1844–1924); Paul Claudel (1868–1955); Alphonse Allais (1854–1905); the poet Guillaume Apollinaire (1880–1918); Maurice Barrès (1862–1923); René Bazin (1853–1932); Colette (1873–1954); the poet and novelist François Coppée (1842–1908); Alphonse Daudet (1840–1897); Alain-Fournier (1886–1914), author of Le Grand Meaulnes (1913)- his only published novel-, who died on the battlefield in September 1914; André Gide (1869–1951); Pierre Louÿs (1870–1925); Maurice Maeterlinck (1862–1949), a Belgian poet and essayist; the symbolist poet Stéphane Mallarmé (1840–1898), who had a literary salon every Tuesday including the leading artists and writers of Paris; Octave Mirbeau (1848–1917); Anna de Noailles (1876–1933), poet and novelist; Charles Péguy (1873–1914), killed at the front on 5 September 1914; Marcel Proust (1871–1922), born in the first year of the Belle Époque, completed in 1913 the first part of In Search of Lost Time, begun in 1902; Jules Renard (1864–1910); Arthur Rimbaud (1854–1891), the young poet with whom Verlaine had a passionate but disastrous affair; Romain Rolland (1866–1944); Edmond Rostand (1868–1918), author of the world-renowned Cyrano de Bergerac; Paul Verlaine (1844–1890). Paris was also the home of one of the greatest Russian writers of the period, Ivan Turgenev.

The Irish playwright Oscar Wilde spent his last months in Paris, after his imprisonment in England and exile in other European cities. He wandered the streets alone, intoxicated and penniless. He died in the shabby Hotel d'Alsace (now called L'Hôtel) on the rue des Beaux-Arts on the Left Bank, after pointing at the wallpaper and declaring "One of us has got to go." (The same hotel was later the residence of another writer in Exile, Jorge Luis Borges). Wilde was first buried in the Cemetery of Bagneux outside the city; in 1909 his remains were transferred to Pere Lachaise Cemetery.

== Between the Wars (1919–1939) ==
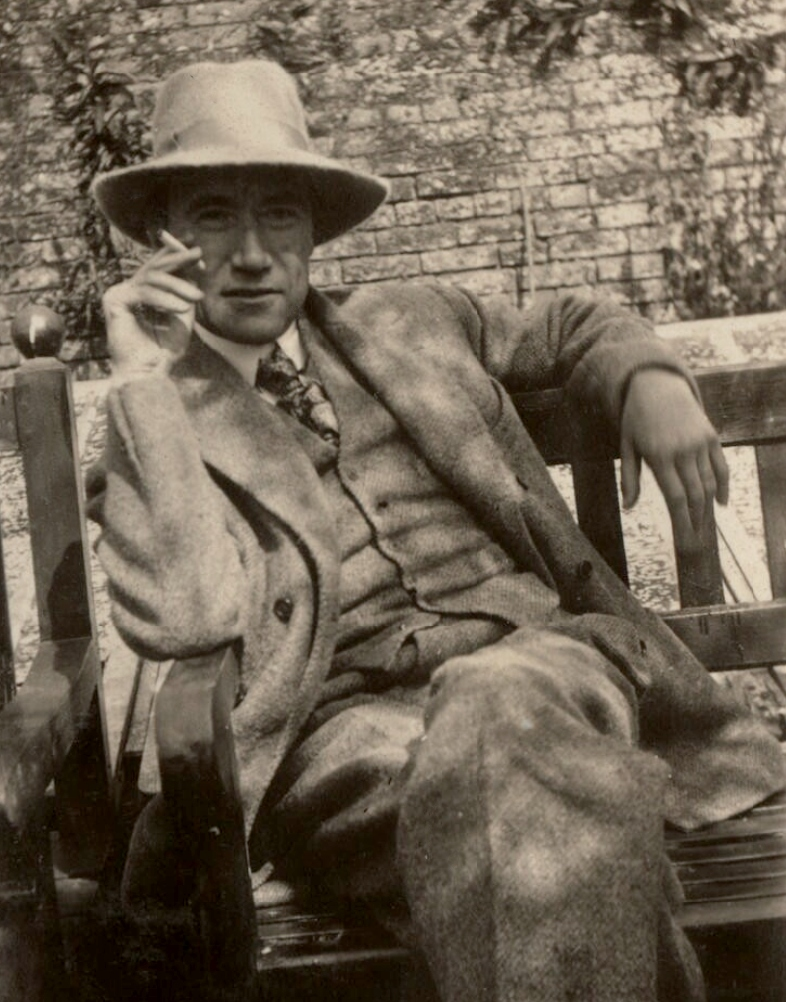
André Gide (1920)

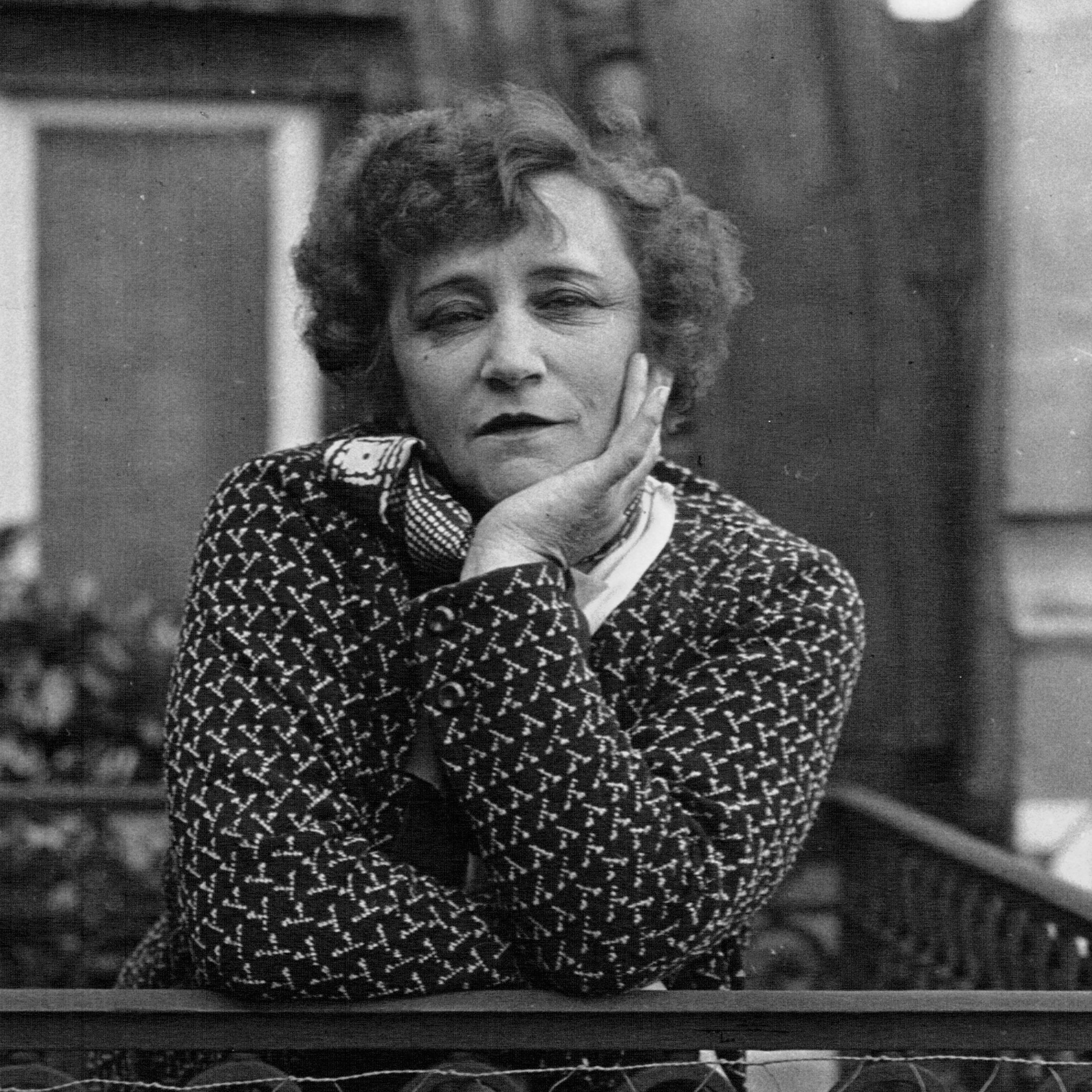
Colette (1932)

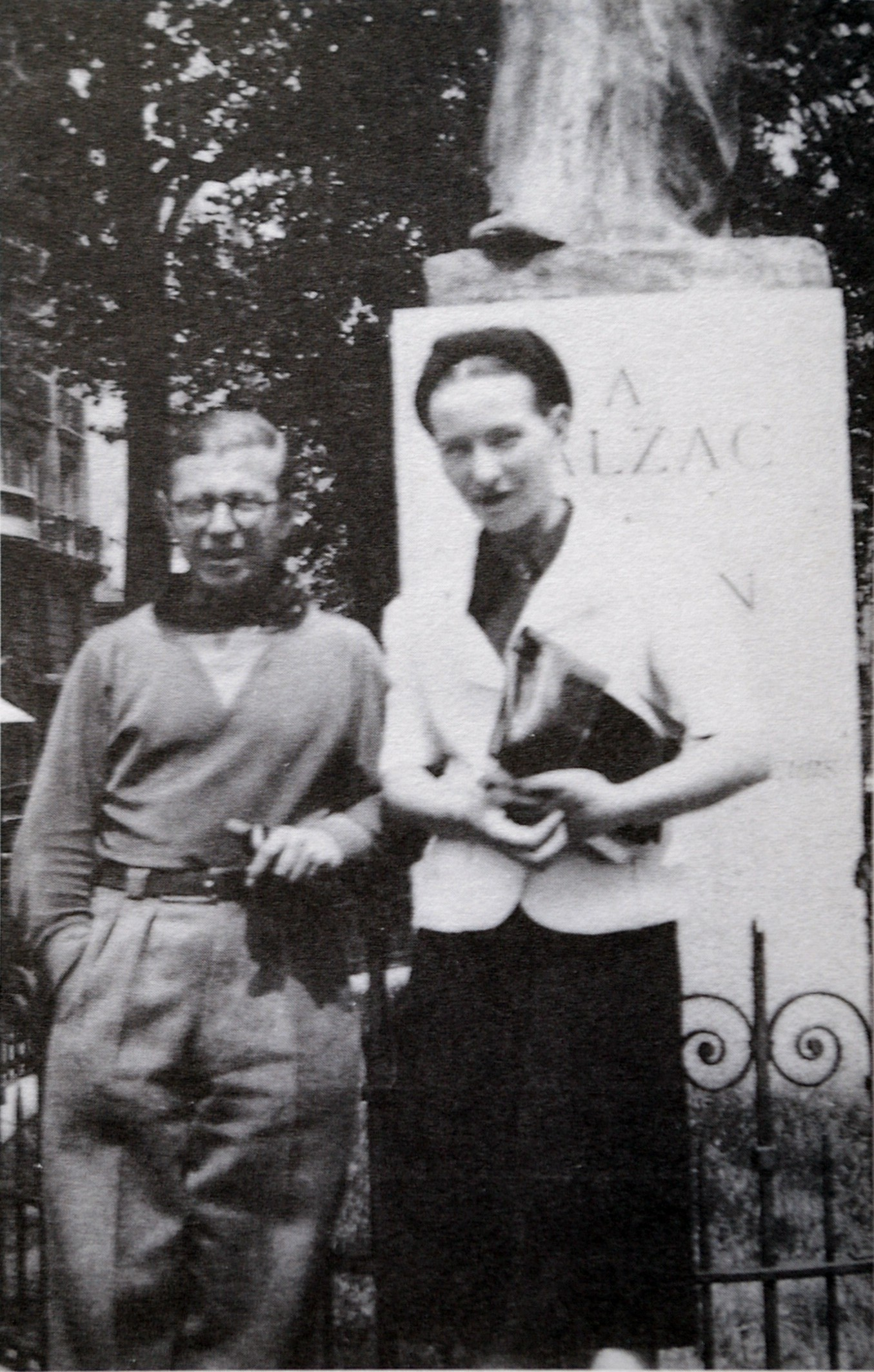
Jean-Paul Sartre and Simone de Beauvoir at the Balzac monument

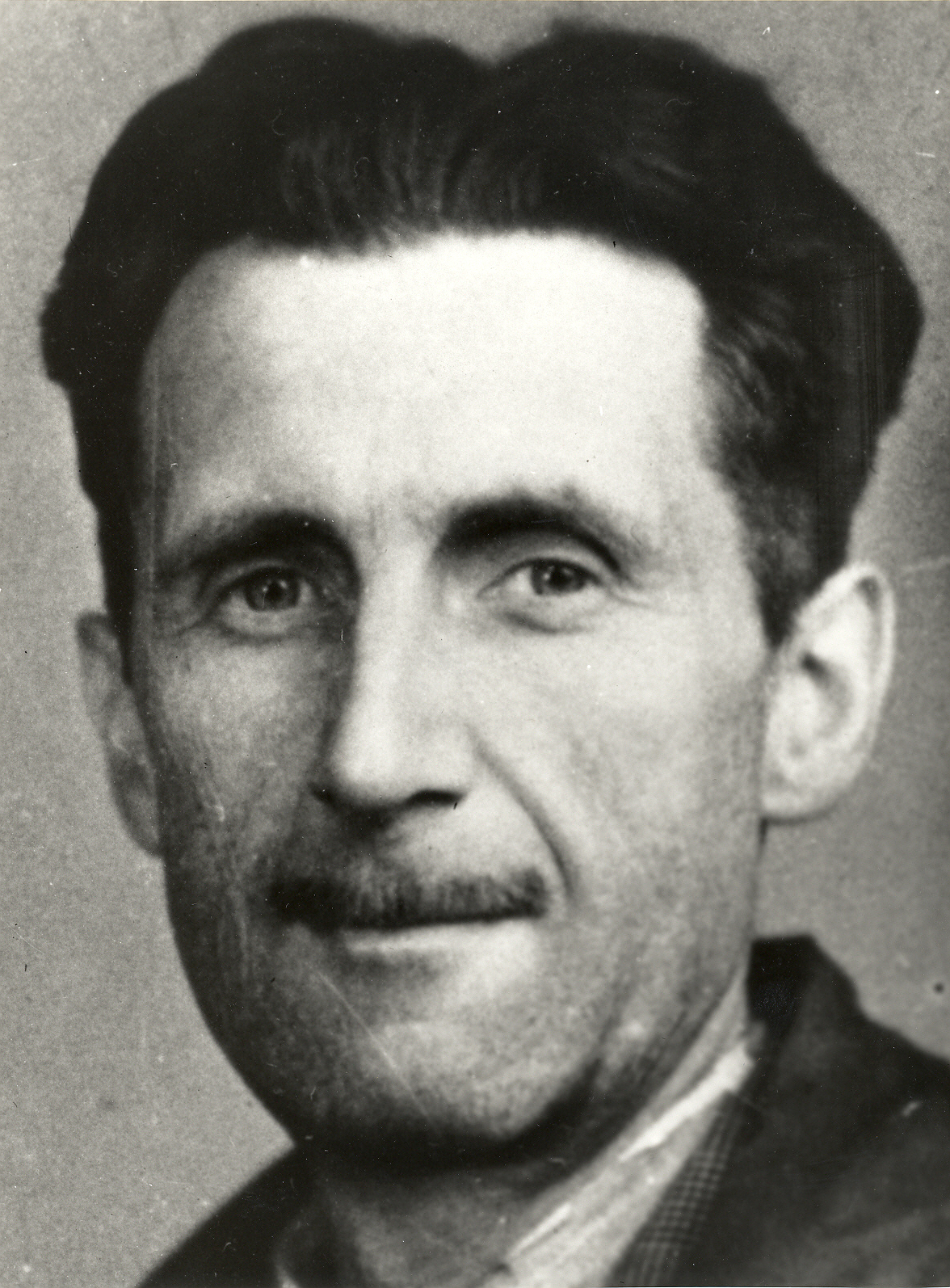
George Orwell spent 1928 and 1929 in Paris, writing Down and Out in Paris and London

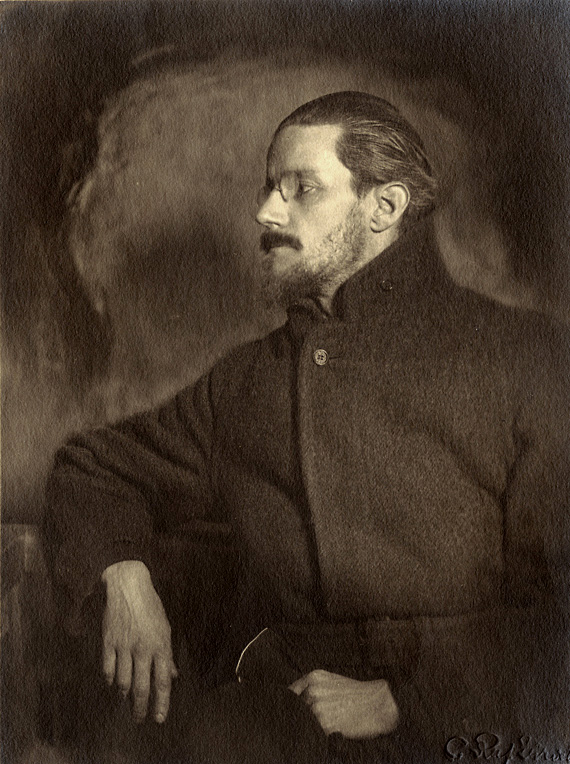
James Joyce spent the last twenty years of his life (1920-1941) between Paris and Zurich

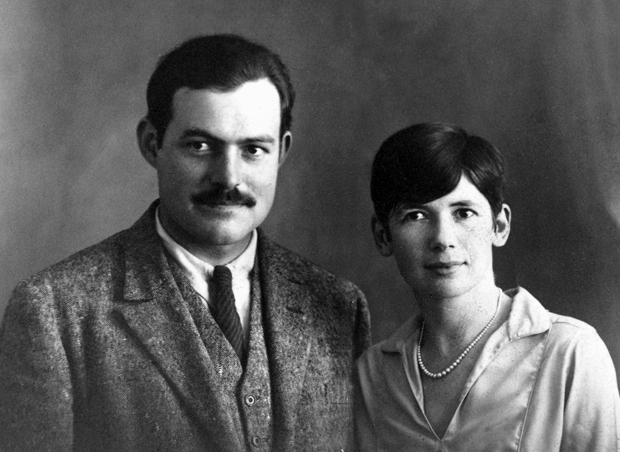
Ernest Hemingway with his second wife, Pauline (1927)

Between the wars, Paris was home to the major French publishing houses and literary journals, and of France's most important writers. Marcel Proust was living at 102 Boulevard Haussmann, editing his most important work, In Search of Lost Time, which he had begun in 1909 but was not finished by the time of his death in 1922. It was finally published in 1929. Anatole France won the Nobel Prize for Literature for his novels and poetry in 1921; the philosopher Henri Bergson, won the Nobel Prize in 1927. Paris was the home of Colette, who lived in an apartment in the Palais Royal; of novelist André Gide, of the playwright-author-filmmaker Jean Cocteau, of the philosopher and novelist Jean-Paul Sartre, and his lifelong companion, Simone de Beauvoir.

It was also home to a large community of expatriate writers from around the world. Ernest Hemingway, hired as a foreign correspondent for the Toronto Star, moved to Paris with his first wife Hadley in 1922 and made his first residence in a small upstairs apartment at 74 rue du Cardinal Lemoine. He remained until 1928, when he left with his second wife, Pauline. While there he wrote and published his first novel, The Sun Also Rises. Others in the literary expatriate community included the poet Ezra Pound, the writer and art patron Gertrude Stein, and the English poet, critic novelist and editor Ford Madox Ford.

In 1920, the Irish author James Joyce received an invitation from the poet Ezra Pound to spend a week with him in Paris. He ended up remaining for twenty years, writing two of his major works, Ulysses and Finnegans Wake. After the war began, in late 1940, he moved to Zurich, where he died. Dutch author E. du Perron spent most of 1922 in Paris, where he mingled with the literary and artistic crowds of Montmartre, and wrote his first novel. In 1933 he returned to the city and stayed there for some years. His magnum opus, Country of Origin, features chapters revolving around the intellectual climate of Paris in the 1930s. The Russian émigré Vladimir Nabokov lived in Paris from 1937 until 1940, when he left for the United States. Eric Arthur Blair, better known under his pen name George Orwell, lived in 1928 and 1929 on the rue du Pot de Fer in the fifth arrondissement, where he worked as a dishwasher in a Paris restaurant, an experience he immortalized in Down and Out in Paris and London.

An important meeting point for expatriate writers was the bookstore Shakespeare and Company (1919–1941), first located at 8 rue Dupuytren from 1919 to 1922, and then from 1922 to 1941 at 12 rue de l'Odeon. It was run by the American Sylvia Beach. Hemingway first met Ezra Pound here, and Beach published Jame's Joyce's Ulysses, which was banned in Britain and the United States.

== 1946–2000 -Existentialism and Expatriates ==
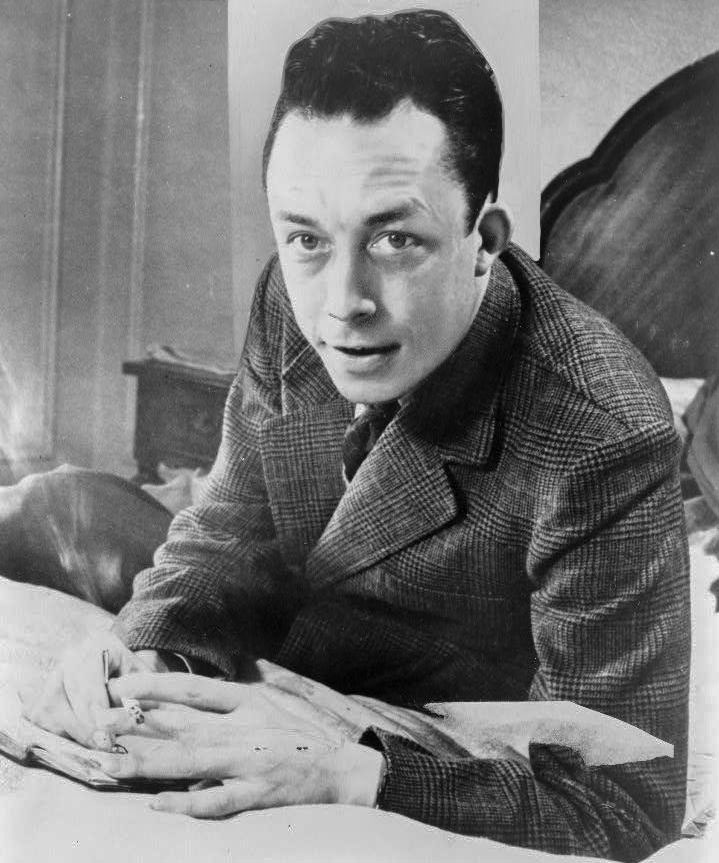
Albert Camus (1957)

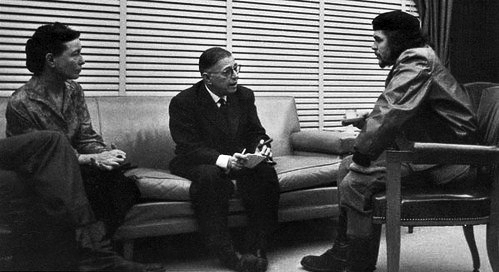
Simone de Beauvoir and Jean-Paul Sartre meet with Che Guevara (1960)

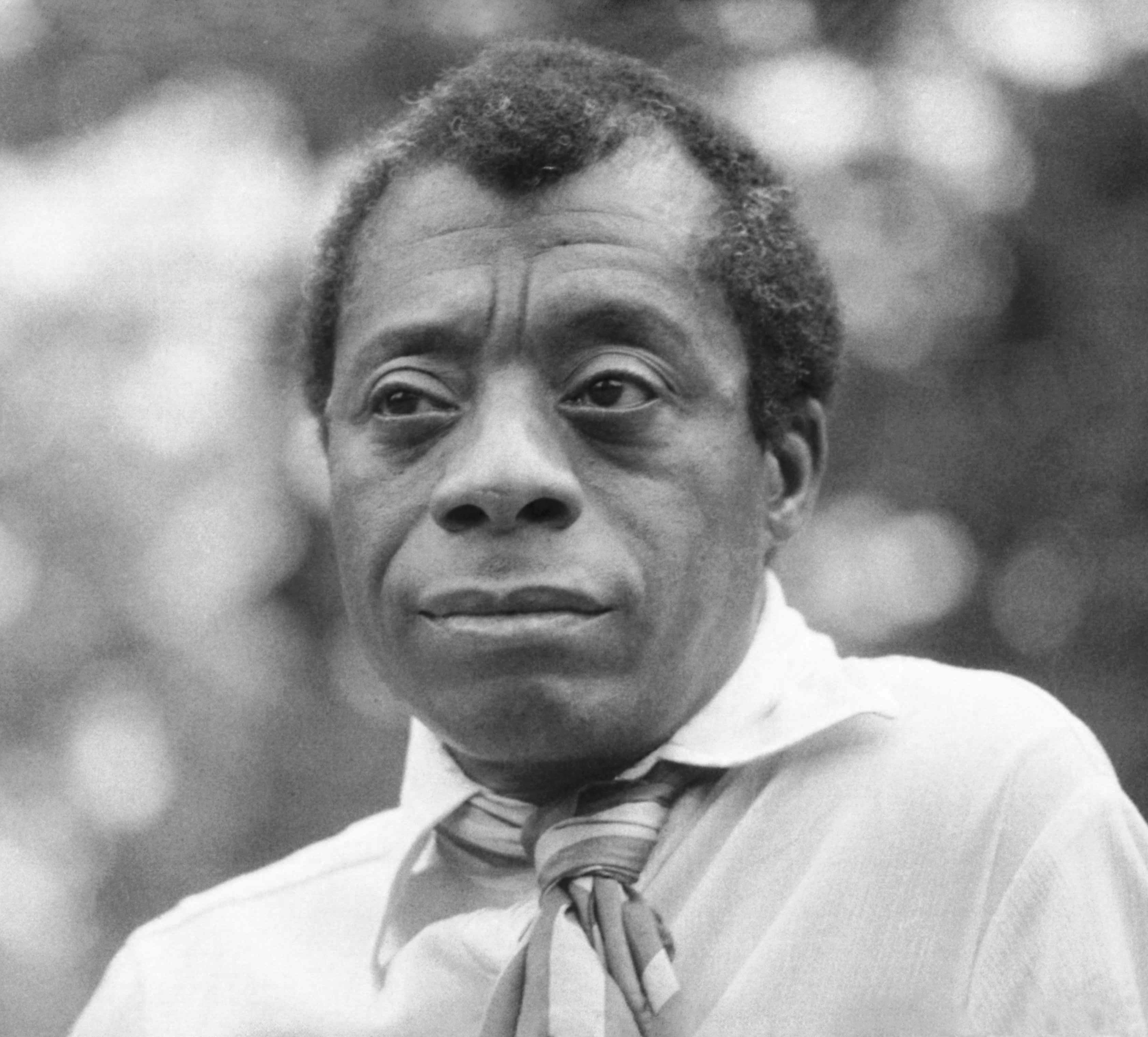
James Baldwin

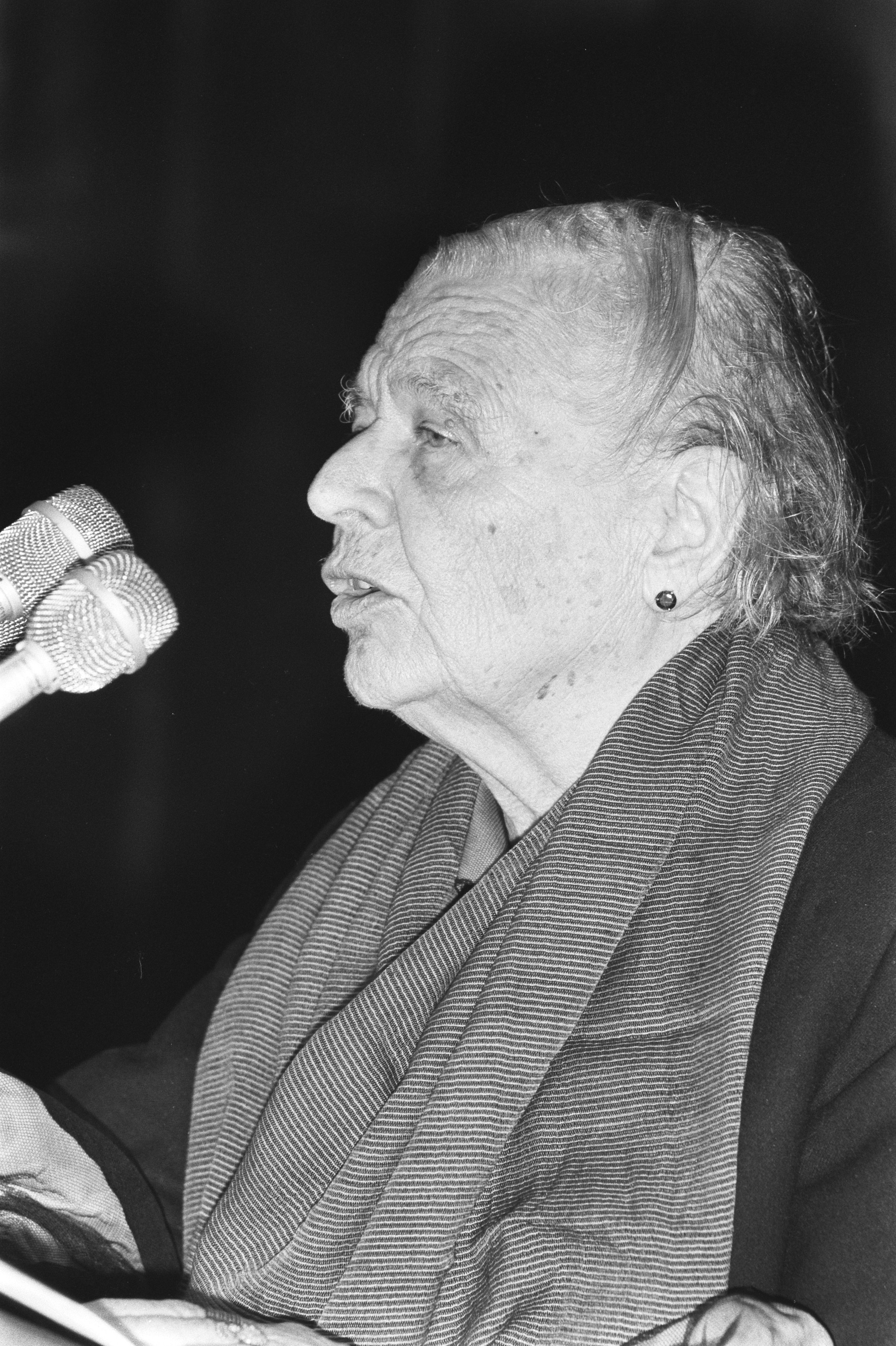
Marguerite Yourcenar

The literary life of Paris after World War II was also centered in Saint-Germain-des-Prés on the left bank, where there was a large concentration of book stores and publishing houses. Because most writers lived in tiny rooms or apartments, they gathered in cafés, most famously the Café de Flore, the Brasserie Lipp and Les Deux Magots, where the philosopher Jean-Paul Sartre and writer Simone de Beauvoir held court. Sartre (1905–1980) was the most prominent figure of the period; he was a philosopher, the founder of the school of existentialism, but also a novelist, playwright, and theater director. He also was very involved in the Paris politics of the left; after the war he was a follower (though not a member) of the Communist Party, then broke with the communists after the Soviet invasion of Hungary, and became an admirer of Fidel Castro and the Cuban Revolution, then of Mao-tse Tung. In 1968 he joined the demonstrations against the government, standing on a barrel to address striking workers at the Renault factory in Billancourt. The legends of Saint-Germain-des-Pres describe him a frequenting the jazz clubs of the neighborhood, but Sartre wrote that he rarely visited them, finding them too crowded, uncomfortable and loud. Simone de Beauvoir (1902–1986), the lifelong companion of Sartre, was another important literary figure, both as an early proponent of feminism and as an autobiographer and novelist.

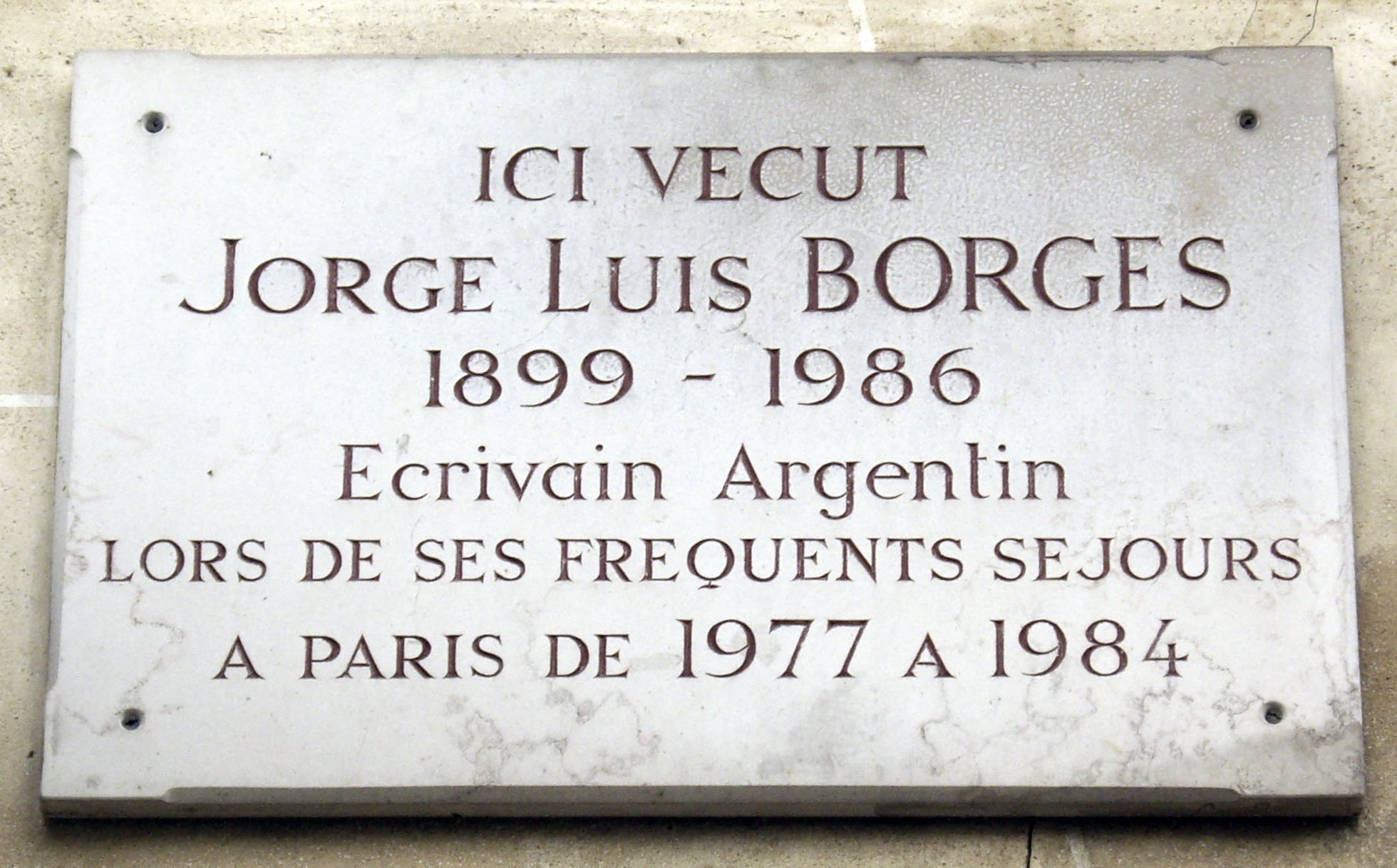
Sign in 13 rue des Beaux-Arts, where Argentine writer Jorge Luis Borges would stay frequently during his visits to Paris

Acclaimed Argentine writer Julio Cortázar, wrote among other works, Hopscotch (1963), his most famous novel, while living in Paris, where he moved to in 1951, due to his opposition to Juan Perón's government.

Juan José Saer, who was considered by many prominent intellectuals as the best Argentine writer after Jorge Luis Borges, lived in Paris from 1968 until his death. He wrote all his most celebrated works while living in Paris, such as El entenado (1983), La grande (2005) and Glosa (1986).

Peruvian Nobel Prize laureate, Mario Vargas Llosa finished his first novel, The Time of the Hero (La ciudad y los perros) in 1963 while living in Paris and also wrote The Green House (La casa verde) there.

Colombian Nobel Prize laureate, Gabriel García Márquez, lived in the Hôtel des Trois Collèges in Paris, where he wrote No One Writes to the Colonel (El coronel no tiene quien le escriba), published in 1961.

Mexican Nobel Prize laureate, Octavio Paz, wrote The Labyrinth of Solitude (El laberinto de la soledad) while living in Paris in 1945.

Other major literary figures in Paris during the period included Albert Camus (1913–1960), like Sartre a writer and novelist of the left but a vocal critic of Stalinism; André Maurois, François Mauriac, André Malraux and Marcel Pagnol. A new literary movement emerged in Paris in the 1950s, known as the Nouveau Roman, "the new novel", the "anti-novel", or "anti-romanticism." Important new writers who emerged in Paris in the 1950s and 1960s included Alain Robbe-Grillet, Marguerite Duras, Nathalie Sarraute, Claude Mauriac, Michel Butor, Claude Simon, Henri Troyat, Maurice Druon, Marguerite Yourcenar, and Michel Tournier. Paris was also home for many notable international writers, including the African-American writers James Baldwin, Chester Himes and Richard Wright, who found the city more welcoming than the U.S. in the early 1950s.

== The 21st century ==
Several writers resident in Paris have distinguished themselves in world literature in the 21st century. Gao Xingjian, born in China in 1940, left his homeland in the 1980s after writing works which displeased the Chinese government. In France he became a prominent writer, playwright, and was awarded the Nobel Prize for Literature in 2000. Other prominent Parisian writers include Patrick Modiano, the winner of the 2014 Nobel Prize for Literature, who was born in 1945 in the Paris suburb of Boulogne-Billancourt, and studied and made his literary career in Paris. Jean d'Ormesson, the senior member of the Academie Française was born in 1925; he is author of a long series of acclaimed autobiographical or partially autobiographical novels.
