= Outline of Paris =

Capital and largest city of France

Flag of Paris

Coat of arms of Paris

The following outline is provided as an overview of and topical guide to Paris:

Paris – capital and most populous city of France, with an area of 105 square kilometres (41 square miles) and an official estimated population of 2,140,526 residents as of 1 January 2019. Since the 17th century, Paris has been one of Europe's major centres of finance, commerce, fashion, science, and the arts.

== General reference ==
- Pronunciation of "Paris"
  - English: /ˈpærɪs/
  - French pronunciation: [paʁi]
- Common English name: Paris
- Official English name: City of Paris
- Adjectival: Parisian
- Demonym: Parisian

== Geography of Paris ==
- Paris is a city, and is both the Capital and primate city of France

=== Location of Paris ===
Paris is situated within the following regions:

- Northern Hemisphere and Eastern Hemisphere
  - Eurasia
    - Europe (outline)
      - Western Europe
        - France (outline)
          - Île-de-France
            - Grande Couronne
              - Petite Couronne

=== Landforms of Paris ===
- Hills in Paris
  - Belleville
  - Butte-aux-Cailles
  - Buttes-Chaumont
  - Chaillot
  - Menilmontant
  - Montagne Sainte-Geneviève
  - Montmartre
  - Montparnasse
  - Passy
- Islands of Paris
  - On the Seine River
    - Île de la Cité
    - Île aux Cygnes
    - Île Saint-Louis
- Waterways of Paris
  - Canals in Paris
    - Canal de l'Ourcq
    - Canal Saint-Denis
    - Canal Saint-Martin
  - Rivers in Paris
    - Bièvre (river)
    - Seine
      - La Rive Droite – The Right Bank
      - La Rive Gauche – The Left Bank

=== Areas of Paris ===
==== Arrondissements of Paris ====
- 1st arrondissement of Paris (Louvre)
- 2nd arrondissement of Paris (Bourse)
- 3rd arrondissement of Paris (Temple)
- 4th arrondissement of Paris (Hôtel-de-Ville)
- 5th arrondissement of Paris (Panthéon)
- 6th arrondissement of Paris (Luxembourg)
- 7th arrondissement of Paris (Palais-Bourbon)
- 8th arrondissement of Paris (Élysée)
- 9th arrondissement of Paris (Opéra)
- 10th arrondissement of Paris (Entrepôt)
- 11th arrondissement of Paris (Popincourt)
- 12th arrondissement of Paris (Reuilly)
- 13th arrondissement of Paris (Gobelins)
- 14th arrondissement of Paris (Observatoire)
- 15th arrondissement of Paris (Vaugirard)
- 16th arrondissement of Paris (Passy)
- 17th arrondissement of Paris (Batignolles-Monceau)
- 18th arrondissement of Paris (Butte-Montmartre)
- 19th arrondissement of Paris (Buttes-Chaumont)
- 20th arrondissement of Paris (Ménilmontant)

=== Locations in Paris ===
- Landmarks in Paris
- Tourist attractions in Paris

==== Bridges in Paris ====
Bridges in Paris

==== Châteaus and hôtels particuliers in Paris ====
- Châteaus in Paris
  - Château de Bagatelle
  - Château de Bagnolet, Paris
  - Château de Bercy
  - Conciergerie
  - Louvre Palace
  - Luxembourg Palace
  - Château de la Muette
  - Palais de la cité
  - Palais-Royal
- Hôtels particuliers in Paris

==== City gates and walls of Paris ====
- City gates of Paris
- City walls of Paris

==== Fortifications of Paris ====
- Barrière d’Enfer
- Bastille
- Fort de Bicêtre
- Fort de Bois-d'Arcy
- Batterie de Bouviers
- Fort de Champigny
- Fort de Châtillon (Paris)
- City gates of Paris
- City walls of Paris
- Fort de Cormeilles-en-Parisis
- Fort de Domont
- Fort d'Aubervilliers
- Fort d'Ivry
- Fort de Charenton
- Fort de l'Est
- Fort de Romainville
- Fort de Villiers
- Fortifications of Paris in the 19th and 20th centuries
- Grand Châtelet
- Fort d'Issy
- Fort Mont-Valérien
- Fort de Montmorency
- Fort de Nogent
- Porte d'Italie
- Porte Maillot
- Redoute de Gravelle
- Fort de Saint-Cyr
- Fort de Sucy
- Thiers wall
- Tour de Nesle
- Tour du coin (Louvre)
- Tour Jean-sans-Peur
- Fort du Trou-d'Enfer
- Fort de Vaujours
- Fort Neuf de Vincennes
- Wall of Charles V
- Wall of Philip II Augustus
- Wall of the Ferme générale

==== Fountains in Paris ====
Fountains in Paris (list)

==== Libraries in Paris ====
Libraries in Paris

==== Monuments and memorials in Paris ====
- Arc de Triomphe
- Arc de Triomphe du Carrousel
- Théâtre de l'Atelier
- Théâtre des Bouffes du Nord
- Théâtre national de Chaillot
- La Cigale
- Elephant of the Bastille
- Flame of Liberty
- Headbutt (sculpture)
- Les Invalides
- July Column
- Luxor Obelisk
- Medici column
- Mémorial des Martyrs de la Déportation
- Théâtre Montparnasse
- Panthéon
- Place des Victoires
- Porte Saint-Denis
- Porte Saint-Martin
- Reines de France et Femmes illustres
- Saint-Jacques Tower

==== Museums and art galleries in Paris ====
- Museums in Paris

==== Opera houses in Paris ====
- List of theatres and entertainment venues in Paris
- Théâtre de la foire
- List of former or demolished entertainment venues in Paris
- Théâtre des Bouffes-Parisiens
- Théâtre du Châtelet
- Comédie-Italienne
- Théâtre Lyrique
- Opéra Bastille
- Opéra-Comique
- Opéra-National
- Palais Garnier
- Théâtre du Palais-Royal (rue Saint-Honoré)
- Théâtre de la Porte Saint-Martin
- Salle Le Peletier
- Théâtre des Tuileries
- Théâtre du Palais-Royal
- Théâtre Feydeau
- Théâtre Louvois
- Théâtre National de la rue de la Loi
- Salle Ventadour

==== Parks and gardens in Paris ====
Parks and gardens in Paris

==== Public squares in Paris ====
- Squares in Paris
- Haussmann's renovation of Paris
- Jean-Charles Adolphe Alphand
- Wallace fountain
- Place du 8 Février 1962
- Place du 8 Novembre 1942
- Place du 18 juin 1940
- Place d'Acadie
- Place de la Bastille
- Square des Batignolles
- Place Beauvau
- Place Blanche
- Place Cambronne
- Place du Carrousel
- Place Charles Michels
- Place Charles de Gaulle
- Place du Châtelet
- Place Clemenceau
- Place de Clichy
- Place Colette
- Place du Colonel Fabien
- Place du Commerce
- Place de la Concorde
- Place Dauphine
- Place Denfert-Rochereau
- Place Dupleix
- Place Emile Goudeau
- Place de l'Estrapade
- Place des États-Unis
- Place des Fêtes
- Place de Fontenoy
- Place de l'Hôtel-de-Ville – Esplanade de la Libération
- Place d'Italie
- Place Jussieu
- Place Louis Lépine
- Place du Louvre
- Place de la Madeleine
- Place Maillot
- Carré Marigny
- Place Maubert
- Place Monge
- Square Montholon
- Place de la Nation
- Place de l'Opéra
- Place du Palais-Royal
- Place du Panthéon
- Place du Parvis de Notre-Dame
- Parvis Notre-Dame – Place Jean-Paul-II
- Place Pigalle
- Place Pinel
- Place Dalida
- Place de la Bataille-de-Stalingrad
- Place du Palais-Bourbon
- Place Jean-Marais
- Place Joachim-du-Bellay
- Place des Pyramides
- Square René-Viviani
- Place de la République
- Rungis International Market
- Place Saint-Augustin
- Place Saint-Gervais
- Place Saint-Jacques
- Place Saint-Michel
- Place Saint-Paul
- Place Saint-Sulpice
- Square d'Orléans
- Place des Ternes
- Place du Tertre
- Place du Trocadéro
- Place Vendôme
- Place des Victoires
- Place des Vosges
- Place de Wagram

==== Religious buildings in Paris ====
- Convents in Paris
  - Abbaye-aux-Bois
  - Cordeliers Convent
  - Couvent des Célestins
  - Couvent des Feuillants
  - Madelonnettes Convent
- Christian monasteries in Paris
  - Abbey of Saint-Germain-des-Prés
  - Abbey of St Genevieve
  - Couvent des Jacobins de la rue Saint-Honoré
  - Couvent des Jacobins de la rue Saint-Jacques
  - Montmartre Abbey
  - Pentemont Abbey
  - Port-Royal Abbey, Paris
  - Saint-Antoine-des-Champs
  - Saint-Martin-des-Champs Priory
  - Val-de-Grâce

==== Streets in Paris ====
- Avenues in Paris
  - Avenue Charles-de-Gaulle (Neuilly-sur-Seine)
  - Avenue d'Italie
  - Avenue George V
  - Avenue Hoche
  - Champs-Élysées
  - Avenue Foch
  - Avenue Henri-Martin
  - Avenue d'Iéna
  - Avenue Kléber
  - Avenue Montaigne
  - Avenue de l'Opéra
  - Avenue des Ternes
  - Avenue Victor-Hugo (Paris)
  - Avenue de Wagram
- Boulevards of Paris
  - Boulevards of the Marshals
  - Boulevard Auguste-Blanqui
  - Boulevard Barbès
  - Boulevard Beaumarchais
  - Boulevard de l'Amiral-Bruix
  - Boulevard des Capucines
  - Boulevard de la Chapelle
  - Boulevard de Clichy
  - Boulevard du Crime
  - Boulevard Haussmann
  - Boulevard de l'Hôpital
  - Boulevard des Italiens
  - Boulevard de la Madeleine
  - Boulevard de Magenta
  - Boulevard Montmartre
  - Boulevard du Montparnasse
  - Boulevard Raspail
  - Boulevard Richard-Lenoir
  - Boulevard de Rochechouart
  - Boulevard Saint-Germain
  - Boulevard Saint-Michel
  - Boulevard de Sébastopol
  - Boulevard de Strasbourg
  - Boulevard du Temple
  - Boulevard Voltaire
  - Boulevard de la Zone
- Quais in Paris
  - Quai André-Citroën
  - Port du Louvre
  - Quai François Mitterrand
  - Quai d'Orsay
  - Quai des Célestins (Paris)
  - Quai Louis-Blériot
  - Quai Voltaire
  - Quai des Tuileries

==== Theatres in Paris ====
Theatres and entertainment venues in Paris

==== Towers in Paris ====
- Eiffel Tower
  - Eiffel Tower replicas and derivatives
  - List of the 72 names on the Eiffel Tower

==== Triumphal arches in Paris ====
- Arc de Triomphe
- Arc de Triomphe du Carrousel
- Porte Saint-Denis
- Porte Saint-Martin

=== Demographics of Paris ===
Demographics of Paris

== Government and politics of Paris ==
- Council of Paris
- Mayors of Paris
- Twin towns and sister cities of Paris

== History of Paris ==
=== History of Paris, by period or event ===
- Paris in the Middle Ages
- Paris in the 16th century
- Paris in the 17th century
- Paris in the 18th century
- Paris in the 19th century
  - Paris under Napoleon
  - Paris during the Restoration
  - Paris under Louis-Philippe
  - Paris during the Second Empire
  - Haussmann's renovation of Paris (1853–1870)
  - Paris in the Belle Époque
- Paris in the 20th century
  - Paris during the First World War
  - Paris between the Wars (1919-1939)
  - Paris in World War II
  - History of Paris (1946-2000)

=== History of Paris, by subject ===
- History of the architecture of Paris
- Battle of Paris
- City walls of Paris
- Former or demolished entertainment venues in Paris
- Expositions in Paris
  - Exposition Internationale des Arts et Techniques dans la Vie Moderne
  - Exposition Universelles held in Paris
    - Exposition Universelle (1855)
    - Exposition Universelle (1867)
    - Exposition Universelle (1878)
    - Exposition Universelle (1889)
    - Exposition Universelle (1900)
  - French Industrial Exposition of 1834
  - French Industrial Exposition of 1844
  - International Exhibition of Modern Decorative and Industrial Arts
  - International Exhibition on Urbanism and Housing
  - International Exposition of Electricity
  - Exposition des produits de l'industrie française
- Fortifications of Paris in the 19th and 20th centuries
- Mayors of Paris
- History of music in Paris
- History of parks and gardens of Paris
- Historical population
- Siege of Paris (disambiguation), several sieges
- Writers in Paris

== Culture of Paris ==
- Symbols of Paris
  - Coat of arms of Paris
  - Flag of Paris

=== Arts in Paris ===
==== Architecture of Paris ====
- Paris architecture of the Belle Époque
- Tallest building in Paris
- Tallest structures in Paris
- Tallest buildings and structures in the Paris region

==== Cinema of Paris ====
- Films set in Paris

==== Music of Paris ====
- Jazz clubs in Paris
- Songs about Paris

==== Theatre in Paris ====
- Theatres and entertainment venues in Paris
  - Former or demolished entertainment venues in Paris

=== People of Paris ===
- People from Paris
  - Honorary citizens of Paris
  - University of Paris people

=== Religion in Paris ===
- Roman Catholic Archdiocese of Paris

=== Sports in Paris ===
- Football in Paris
- Running in Paris
  - Paris Half Marathon
  - Paris Marathon

== Economy and infrastructure of Paris ==
- Public services in Paris
  - Paris Public Library
- Tourism in Paris
  - Tourist attractions in Paris

=== Hotels in Paris ===
- Beat Hotel
- Castille Paris
- Hôtel Costes
- Hôtel de Crillon
- Hôtel Barrière Le Fouquet's
- Four Seasons Hotel George V
- Hôtel Au Manoir Saint Germain des Prés
- Hôtel de Saint Fiacre
- Hotel des Trois Collèges
- Hotel La Louisiane
- Hôtel Raphael
- Hôtel Régina
- L'Hôtel
- Hyatt Regency Paris Étoile
- InterContinental Paris Le Grand Hotel
- Hôtel Le Bristol Paris
- Les Hôtels Baverez
- Hôtel Lutetia
- Maison Souquet
- Majestic Hôtel-Spa
- Mandarin Oriental, Paris
- Le Meurice
- Hotel Napoleon
- Palace (hotel)
- The Peninsula Paris
- Pershing Hall
- Piscine Molitor
- Plaza Athénée
- Hôtel Ritz Paris
- Sofitel Paris Le Faubourg
- The Westin Paris – Vendôme

=== Transportation in Paris ===
- Rail transport in Paris
  - Paris railway stations
  - Paris Metro
  - Paris Metro stations
  - RER stations
- Road transport in Paris
  - Cycling in Paris
  - Bridges in Paris

== Education in Paris ==
- Secondary education in Paris
  - Institutions of higher education in Paris
    - Universities in Paris
      - University of Paris

== Health care in Paris ==
- Hospitals in Paris
  - Beaujon Hospital
  - Hôpital de la Charité
  - Hôpital Cochin
  - Curie Institute (Paris)
  - Hôpital des Enfants-Trouvés
  - General Hospital of Paris
  - Hôpital Européen Georges-Pompidou
  - Hôtel-Dieu de Paris
  - Lariboisière Hospital
  - Necker-Enfants Malades Hospital
  - Pitié-Salpêtrière Hospital
  - Hôpital Saint-Louis
  - Val-de-Grâce

== Publications about Paris ==
- Bibliography of Paris

== See also ==
- Outline of geography

=== Place these in body of outline ===
- Boulevards of the Marshals
- Foreign cultural institutes in Paris
- List of Charvet customers
- Monuments historiques in Paris
- Town halls in Paris
