= Landmarks in Paris =

This article presents the main landmarks in the city of Paris within administrative limits, divided by its 20 arrondissements. Landmarks located in the suburbs of Paris, outside of its administrative limits, while within the metropolitan area are not included in this article.

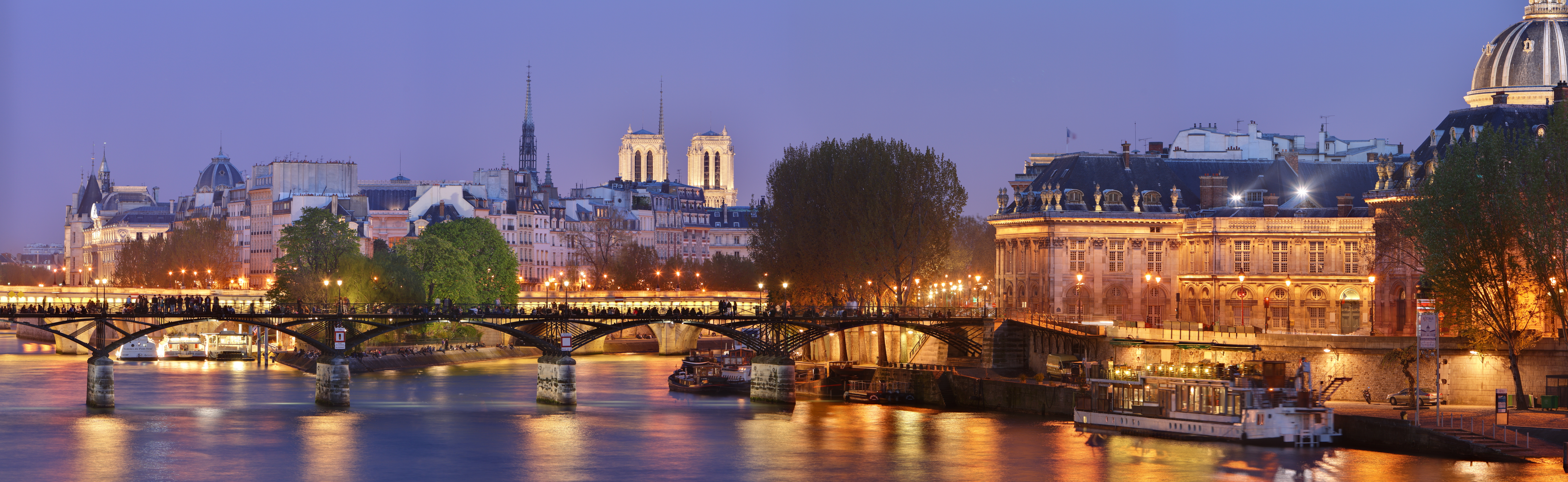
Panorama of the city centre of Paris along the Seine river which shows some of its landmarks.

== 1st arrondissement ==
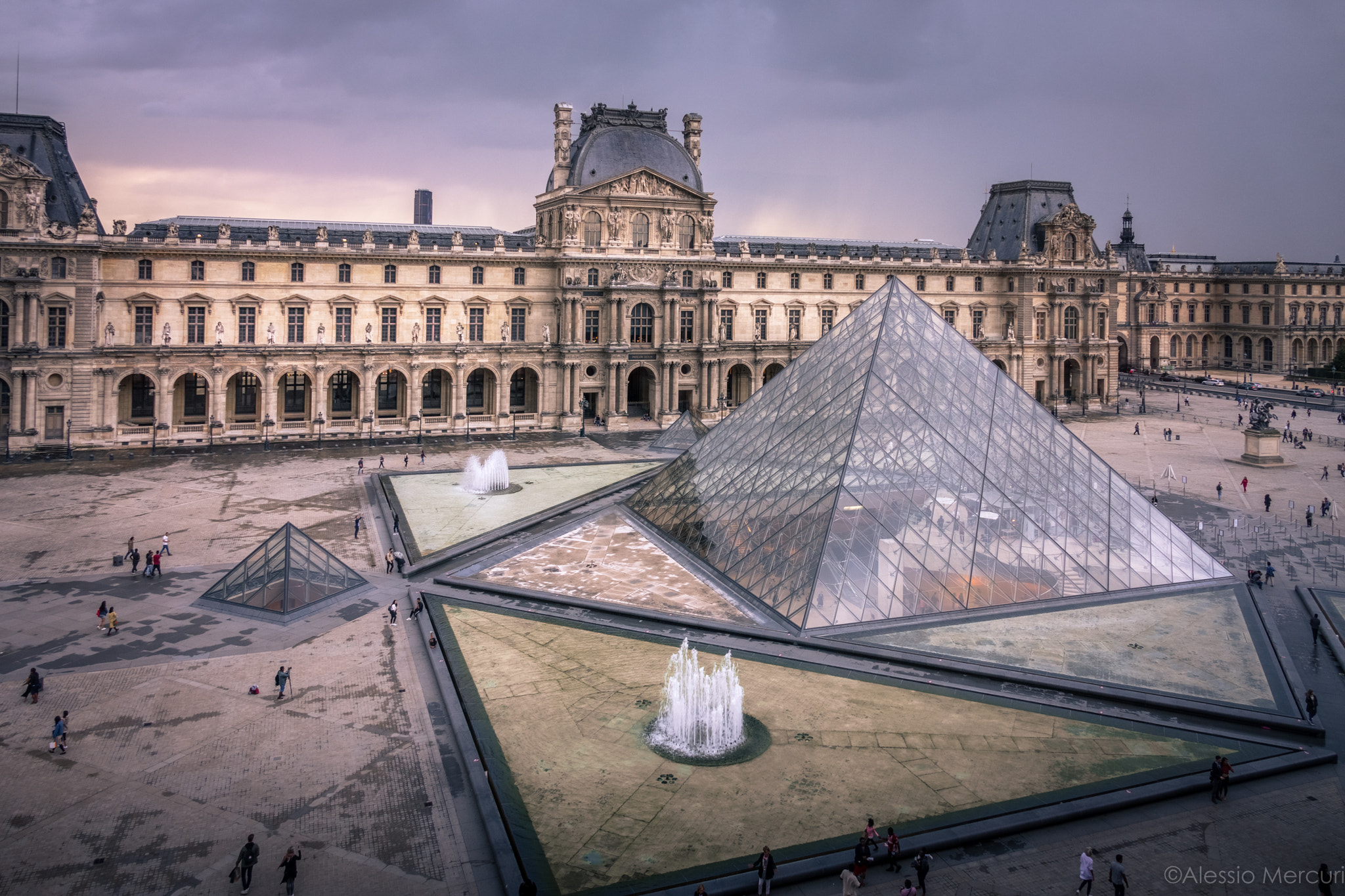
The Louvre

The 1st arrondissement forms much of the historic centre of Paris. Place Vendôme is famous for its deluxe hotels such as Hôtel Ritz, The Westin Paris – Vendôme, Hôtel de Toulouse (headquarters of Banque de France), Hôtel du Petit-Bourbon, Hôtel Meurice, and Hôtel Regina Les Halles were formerly Paris's central meat and produce market, and, since the late 1970s, are a major shopping centre. The old Halles were demolished in 1971 and replaced by the Forum des Halles. The central market, the biggest wholesale food market in the world, was transferred to Rungis, in the southern suburbs.

The Axe historique, is a line of monuments which begins in the first arrondissement at the center of the Louvre with equestrian statue of Louis XIV and continues through the 8th toward the west through the Arc de Triomphe du Carrousel, the Tuileries Gardens, the Luxor Obelisk erected in the centre of Place de la Concorde, the Champs-Élysées, the Arc de Triomphe, centred in the Place de l'Étoile circus, the Avenue de la Grande Armée (through the 16th and the 17th), and ends at the Grande Arche de la Défense outside of Paris. The former Conciergerie prison held some prominent Ancien Régime members before their deaths during the French Revolution. Also of note in the 1st arrondissement are the theatres Théâtre du Châtelet, Théâtre du Palais-Royal, squares such as Place des Pyramides, Place Dauphine, Place des Victoires and Place du Châtelet, the Comédie-Française, Galerie nationale du Jeu de Paume, the Palais de Justice and Palais-Royal.

== 2nd arrondissement ==
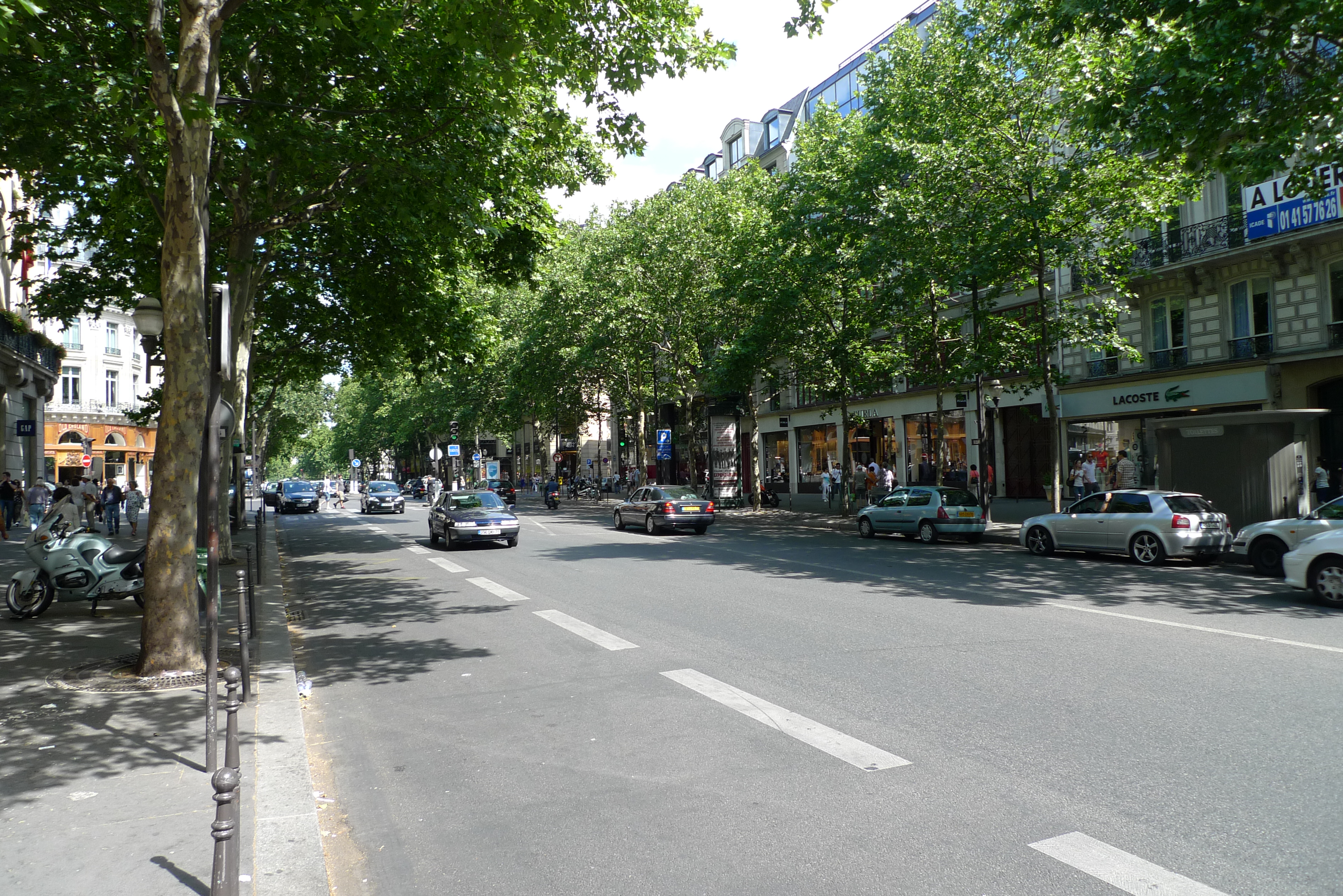
Boulevard des Capucines

The 2nd arrondissement of Paris lies to the north of the 1st. The Boulevard des Capucines, Boulevard Montmartre, Boulevard des Italiens, Rue de Richelieu and Rue Saint-Denis are major roads running through the district. The 2nd arrondissement is the theatre district of Paris, overlapping into the 3rd, and contains the Théâtre des Capucines and Théâtre-Musée des Capucines, Opéra-Comique, Théâtre des Variétés, Théâtre des Bouffes-Parisiens, Théâtre du Vaudeville and Théâtre Feydeau. Also of note are the Académie Julian, Bibliothèque nationale de France, Café Anglais and Galerie Vivienne.

== 3rd arrondissement ==
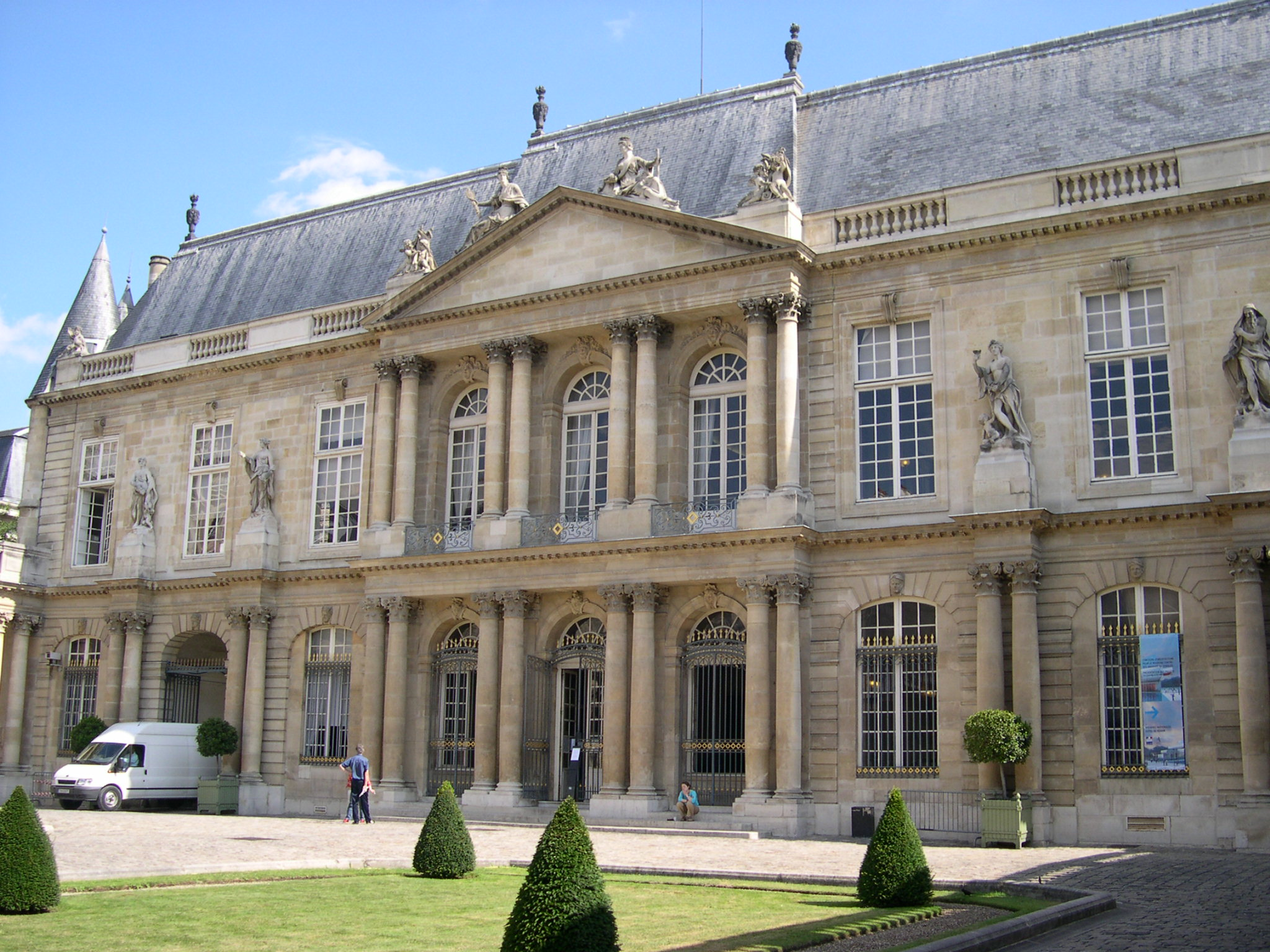
The National Archives building of the Musée des Archives Nationales,

The 3rd arrondissement is located to the northeast of the 1st. Le Marais is a trendy district spanning the 3rd and 4th arrondissements. It is architecturally very well preserved, and some of the oldest houses and buildings of Paris can be found there. It is a very culturally open place, known for its Chinese, Jewish and gay communities. The Place des Vosges, established in 1612 to celebrate the wedding of Louis XIII to Anne of Austria lies at the border of the 3rd and 4th arrondissements and is the oldest planned square in Paris, and the Place de la République was named after the constitutional change in France. The 3rd arrondissement is noted for its museums such as Musée des Archives Nationales, Musée Picasso, Musée de la Chasse et de la Nature, Musée Cognacq-Jay, Musée d'Art et d'Histoire du Judaïsme, Musée de la Poupée, Musée des Arts et Métiers and the Carnavalet Museum, and theatres such as Théâtre Déjazet, Théâtre de la Gaîté, and Théâtre du Marais. Several hotels are located in this district including Hôtel de Guénégaud and Hôtel de Soubise.

== 4th arrondissement ==
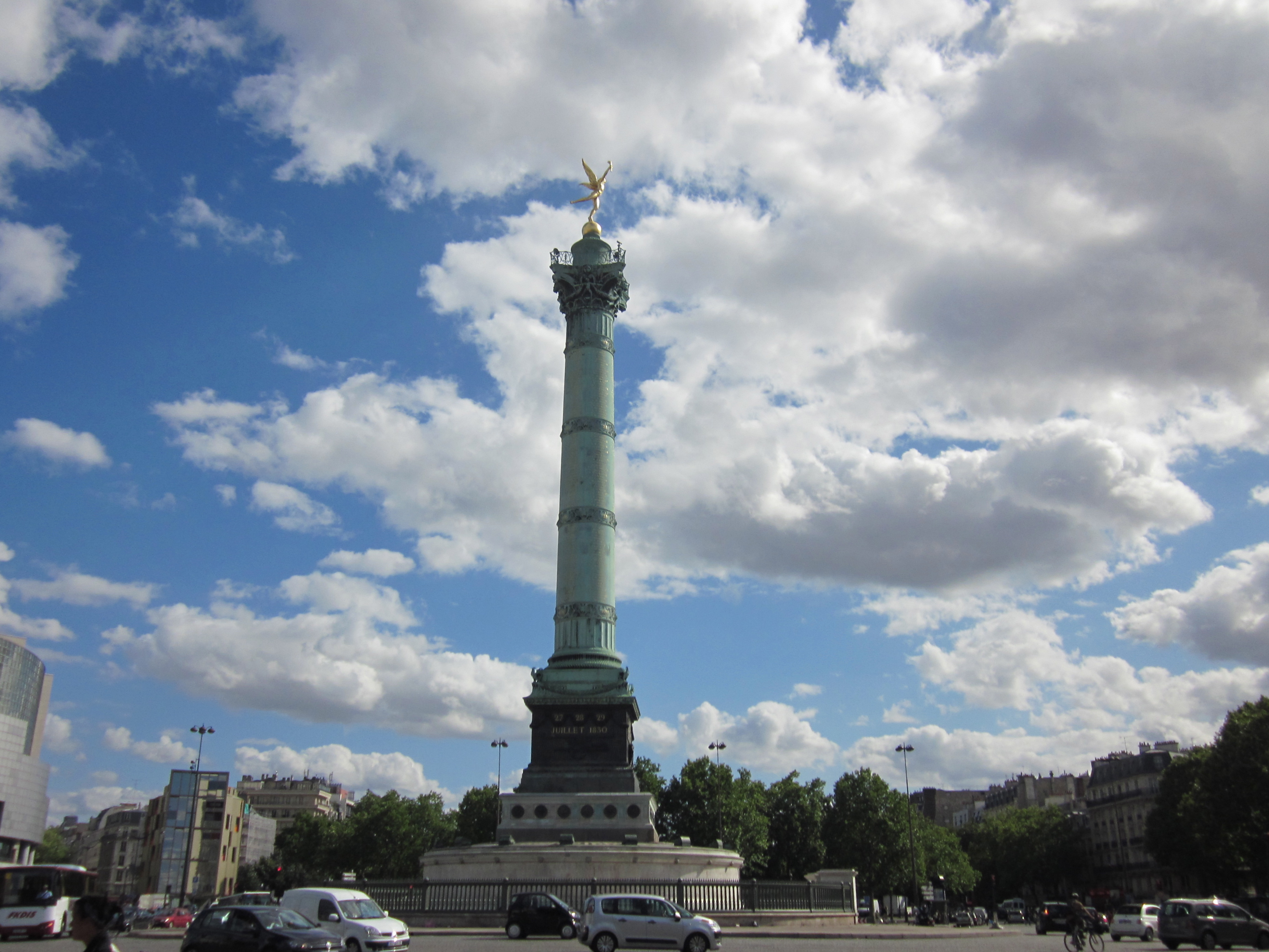
Place de la Bastille

The 4th arrondissement is located to the east of the 1st. Place de la Bastille (4th, 11th and 12th arrondissements, right bank) is a district of great historical significance, for not just Paris, but also all of France. Because of its symbolic value, the square has often been a site of political demonstrations, and it has a tall column commemorating the final resting place of the revolutionaries killed in 1830 and 1848. Bibliothèque de l'Arsenal, La Force Prison, Centre Georges Pompidou and Lycée Charlemagne are notable institutions here. The 12th-century cathedral Notre Dame de Paris on the Île de la Cité is one of the best-known landmarks of the 4th arrondissement, and there are the Gothic 13th-century Sainte-Chapelle palace chapel, Notre-Dame-des-Blancs-Manteaux, Saint-Louis-en-l'Île, Saint-Merri, Saint-Paul-Saint-Louis, St-Gervais-et-St-Protais, and Temple du Marais. Roads running through the 4th arrondissement include Rue Charlemagne, Rue de Rivoli, Rue des Francs-Bourgeois, and Rue des Rosiers. There are also a number of notable hotels in the district, including Hôtel de Beauvais, Hôtel de Sully, Hôtel de Sens, Hôtel de Ville, Hôtel Lambert, and Hôtel Saint-Pol, and a significant number of bridges, including Pont au Change, Pont au Double, Pont de Sully, Pont Louis-Philippe, Pont Marie, Pont Notre-Dame, Pont Saint-Louis, and Pont Saint-Michel.

== 5th arrondissement ==
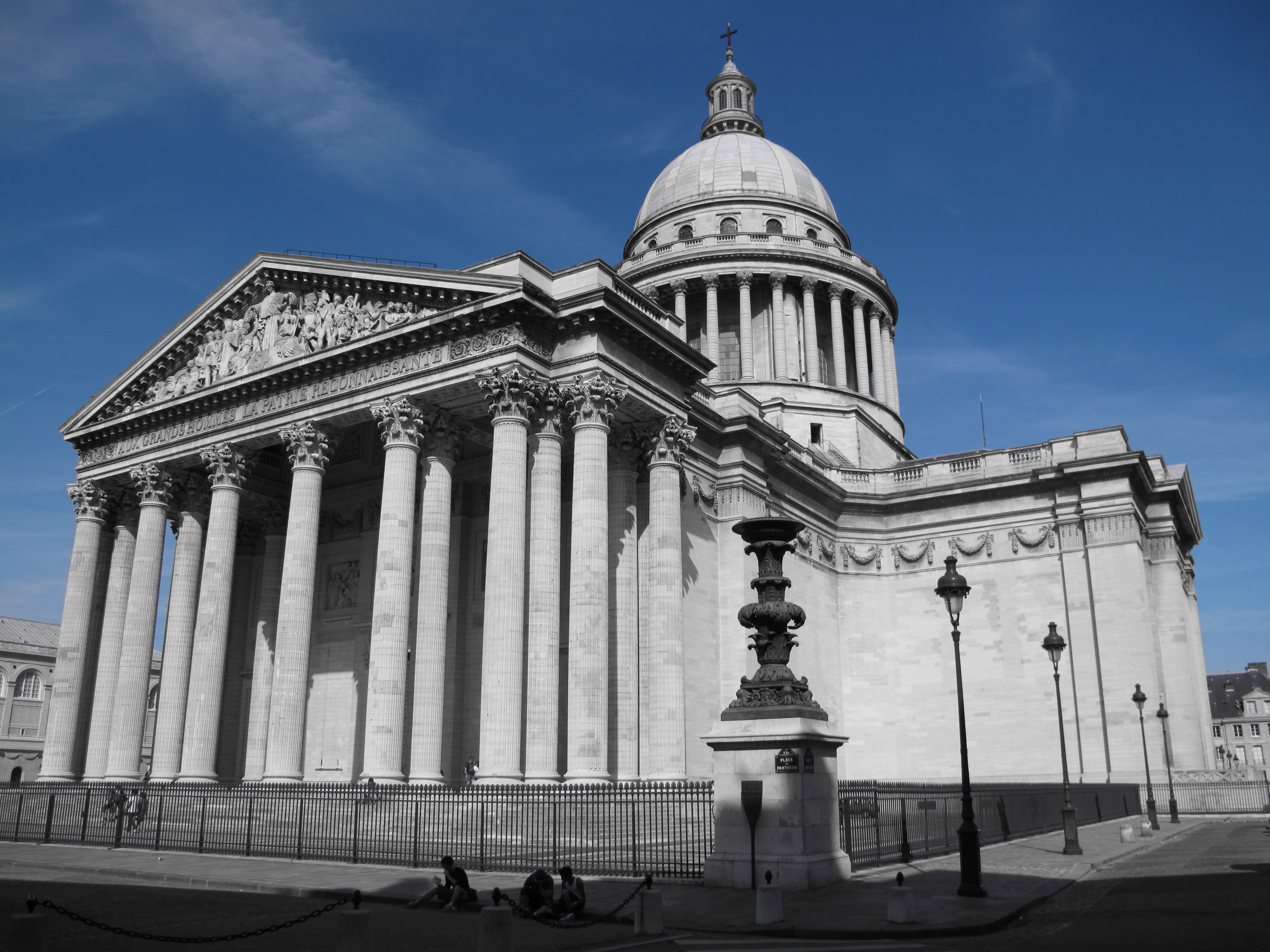
The Panthéon

Quartier Latin (5th and 6th arrondissements, "Left Bank") is a 12th Century scholastic centre formerly stretching between the "Left Bank's" Place Maubert and the Sorbonne campus of the University of Paris, is the oldest and one of the most famous colleges in Europe and the World. It is known for its lively atmosphere and many bistros. Various higher-education establishments, such as Collège de France, Collège Sainte-Barbe, Collège international de philosophie, Sciences Po Paris, the École Normale Supérieure, Mines ParisTech, and the Jussieu university campus, make it a major educational centre in Paris. The Panthéon church is where many of France's illustrious men and women are buried. Also of note is the Arab World Institute, Musée Curie, Hotel des Trois Colleges, Jardin des Plantes, Musée national du Moyen Âge, Muséum national d'histoire naturelle Paris Mosque, Paris Observatory, Sainte-Geneviève Library, and Théâtre de la Huchette.

== 6th arrondissement ==
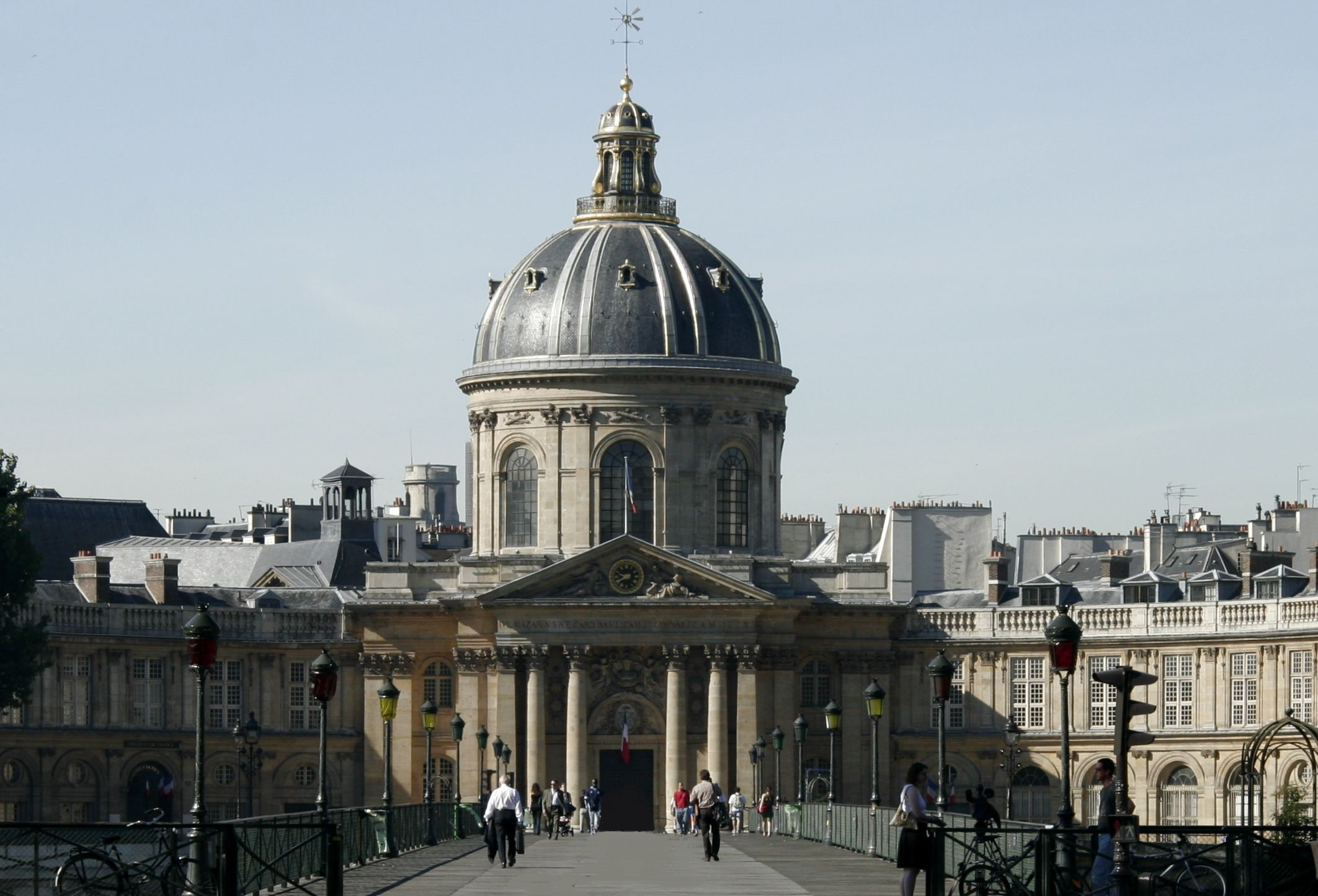
Académie française

The 6th arrondissement, to the south of the centre and Seine has numerous hotels and restaurants and also educational institutions. Hotels located in the district include Hôtel Au Manoir Saint Germain des Prés, Hôtel de Chimay, Hôtel de Vendôme, Hôtel des Monnaies, Hôtel Lutetia, and L'Hôtel, cafés include Café de Flore, Café Procope, and Café de la Rotonde, and academies and schools include the Académie française, the medical school Académie Nationale de Médecine, Académie de la Grande Chaumière, Collège Stanislas de Paris, School for Advanced Studies in the Social Sciences, Paris Tech, and the American Graduate School in Paris, with its Business and Economics and International Relations and Diplomacy schools. Among the museums located in the 6th arrondissement are the Musée "Bible et Terre Sainte", Musée d'Anatomie Delmas-Orfila-Rouvière, Musée Dupuytren, and Musée Edouard Branly. The Jardin du Luxembourg contains one of the several small-scale Statues of Liberty in Paris. It was created by Bartholdi who created the larger version of the statues which was sent as a gift from France to the United States in 1886 and now stands in New York City's harbour. The Odéon-Théâtre de l'Europe is located in this district, as is the Luxembourg Palace. The Pont des Arts, Pont Neuf, and Pont Saint-Michel bridges lead across the Seine to the historic centre.

== 7th arrondissement ==
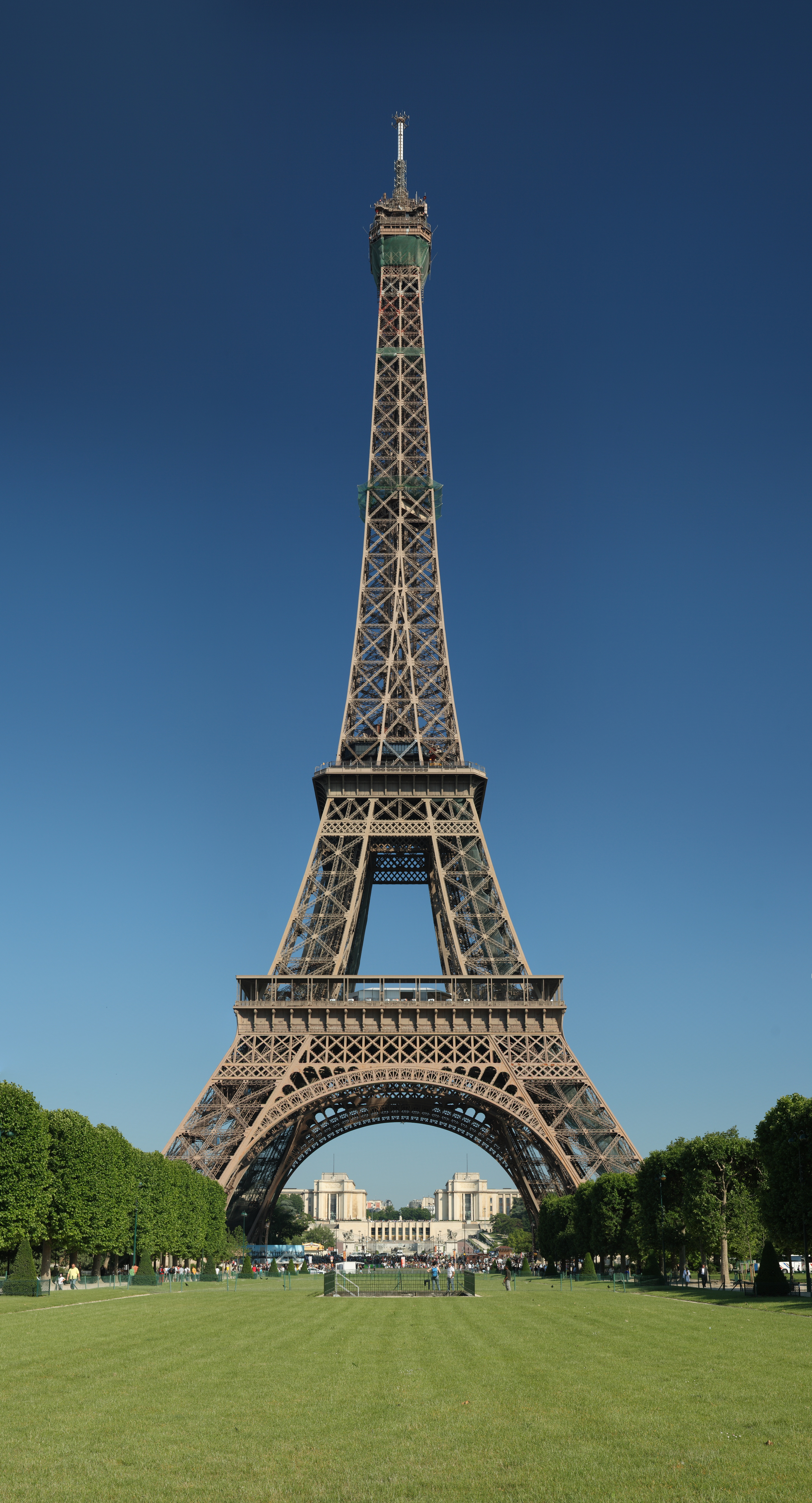
The Eiffel Tower is one of the best-known structures in the world

The 7th arrondissement lies to the southwest of the centre, across the Seine. The Eiffel Tower is the most famous landmark of the 7th arrondissement and of Paris itself. It was a "temporary" construction by Gustave Eiffel for the 1889 Universal Exposition (early "World's Fair"), but was never dismantled and is now an enduring symbol of Paris, instantly recognized throughout the World. The Axe historique (Historical axis) is a line of monuments, buildings, and thoroughfares that run in a roughly straight line from the city centre westwards. Many hotels are located in this district including Hôtel Biron, Hôtel de Castries, Hôtel de Conti, Hôtel de Mademoiselle de Condé, Hôtel du Châtelet, and Hôtel Matignon. The Invalides museum is the burial place for many great French soldiers, including Napoleon Bonaparte, later the Emperor Napoleon I, (1769–1821), and the 18th Century military school, Ecole Militaire, is also located here. Other museums include the Musée Rodin and the Musée de la Légion d'honneur. The Ukrainian Embassy and the World Heritage Centre lie in the 7th arrondissement, and several bridges crossing the Seine include Pont de la Concorde and Pont Royal.

== 8th arrondissement ==
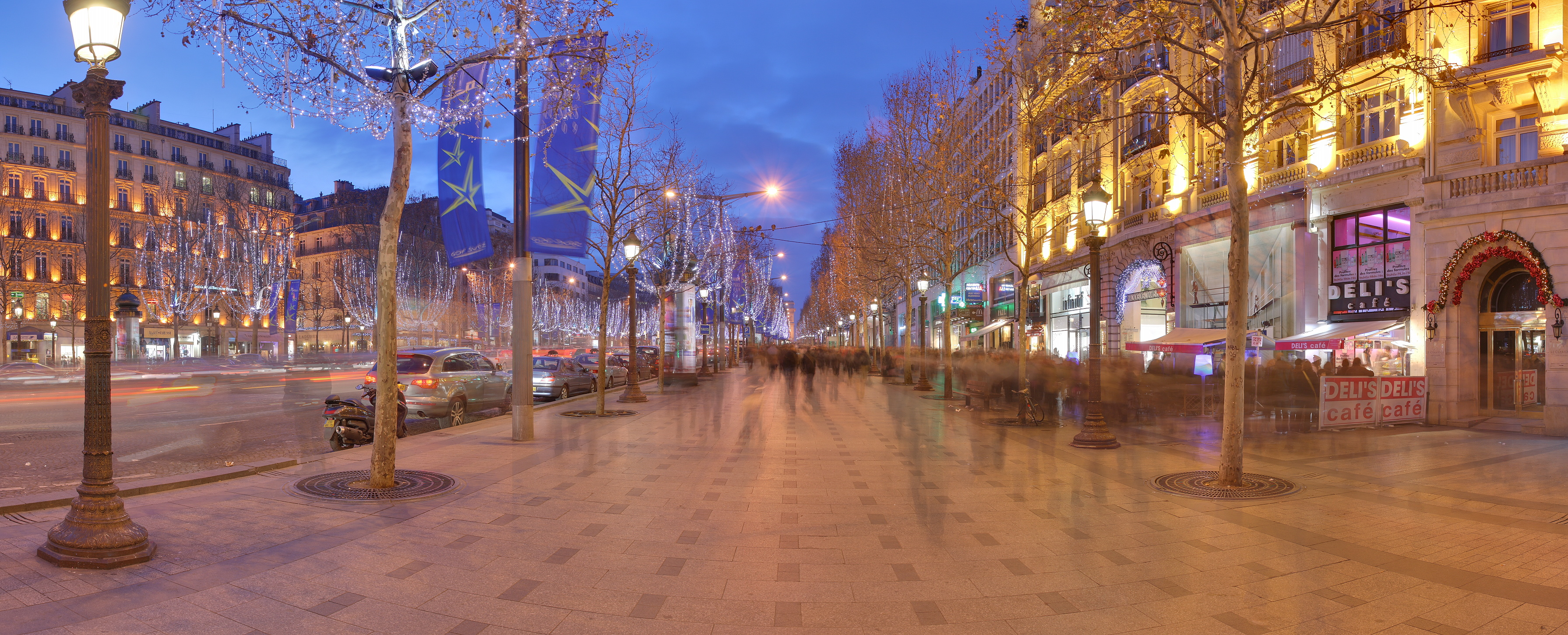
Avenue des Champs-Élysées during Christmas

The Avenue des Champs-Élysées is a 17th-century avenue connecting the Place de la Concorde and the Napoleonic Arc de Triomphe, which straddles the 8th, 16th and 17th arrondissements. It is a major tourist attraction and shopping street, one of the most famous routes of the World, hosting labels such as Sephora, Lancel, Louis Vuitton and Guerlain, as well as Renault, Toyota and numerous small souvenir outlets, and is perhaps the most well-known street in France. The Canadian and American Embassies and many hotels lie in the 8th arrondissement, including Hôtel de Crillon, Hôtel Le Bristol Paris, Hôtel de la Marine, Hôtel de Marigny, Hôtel de Pontalba, Hôtel Fouquet's Barrière Four Seasons Hotel George V, Hotel Napoleon and Hôtel Salomon de Rothschild as well as the Les Ambassadeurs, Ledoyen, and Taillevent restaurants. Theatres located here include the Théâtre des Champs-Élysées, Théâtre des Folies-Marigny, Théâtre de la Madeleine and Théâtre Marigny, and museums include the Musée Cernuschi, Musée Jacquemart-André and Musée Nissim de Camondo.

Place de la Concorde was built as the "Place Louis XV", site of the infamous guillotine and execution in 1793 of Louis XVI, the King of France during the French Revolution, (1789–1799), setting off the infamous "Reign of Terror", where the severed, bloody head of the King was exhibited to the crowds of Parisians. The Egyptian obelisk of Luxor is Paris's "oldest monument". On this square, on either side of the Rue Royale, there are two identical stone buildings: the eastern one houses the French Naval Ministry, the western the luxurious Hôtel de Crillon. Avenue Montaigne, next to the Champs-Élysées, is home to luxury brand labels such as "Chanel", "Prada", "Christian Dior" and "Givenchy". Faubourg Saint-Honoré is not only home to the Élysée Palace (official residence and home of the President of the French Republic, but is also one of the city's high-fashion districts with labels such as "Hermès" and "Christian Lacroix". The Église de la Madeleine is located in the 8th arrondissement.

== 9th arrondissement ==
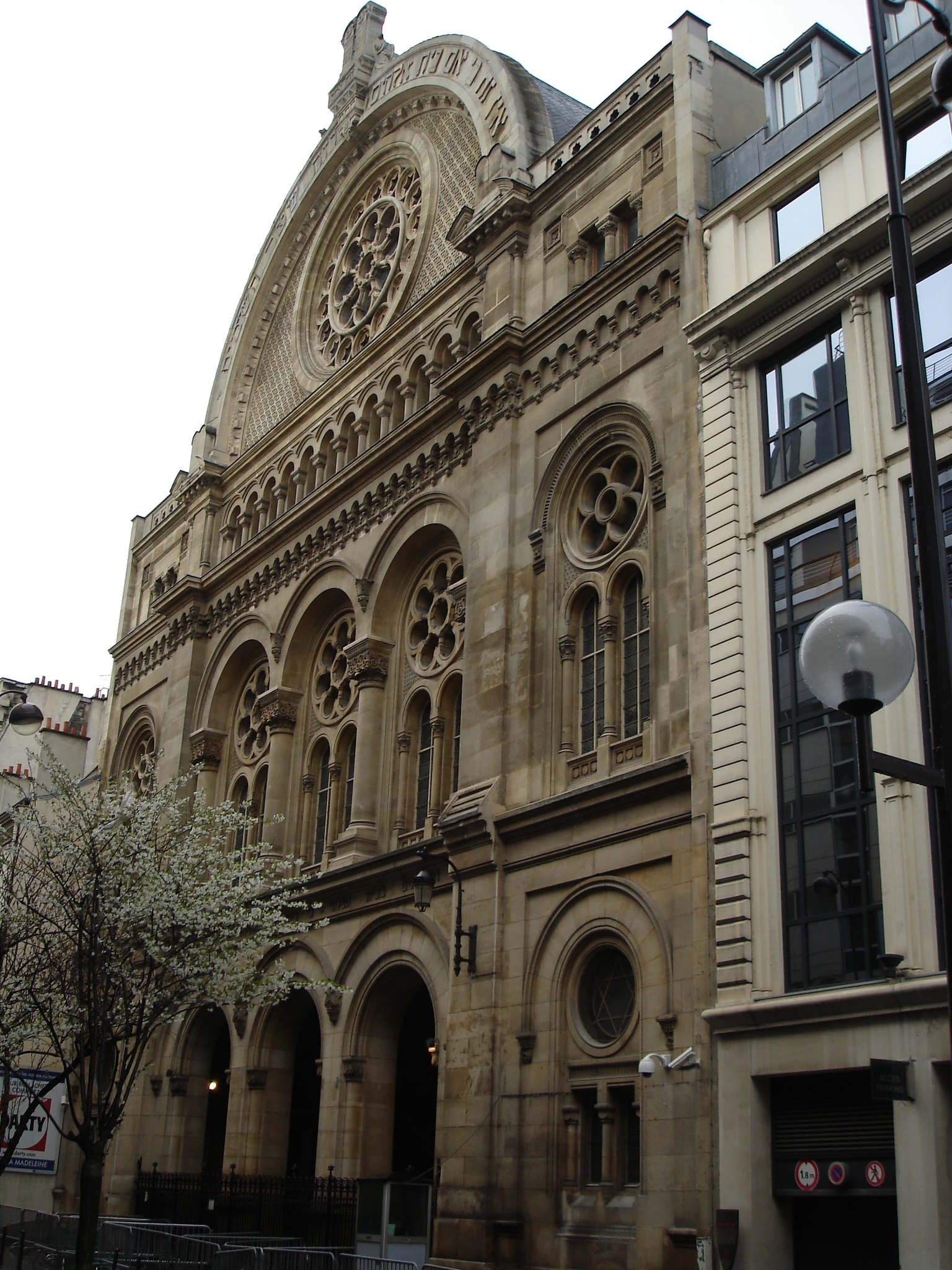
Grand Synagogue of Paris

The 9th arrondissement lies north of the centre and is a continuation of the theatre and museum district with theatres including Théâtre de l'Athénée, Éden-Théâtre, Théâtre Mogador, Théâtre de l'Œuvre, Théâtre des Nouveautés, Théâtre du Vaudeville, Théâtre de Paris and Théâtre Verlaine, and museums such as Musée Grévin, Musée du Parfum, Musée national Gustave Moreau, Musée de la Franc-Maçonnerie and Musée de la Vie Romantique. The district also contains the Café de la Paix, Casino de Paris, Lycée Condorcet, Grand Synagogue of Paris, Salle des Concerts Herz, and several hotels such as Hôtel Drouot, Hôtel Guimard and Hôtel Thellusson.

Avenue de l'Opéra is a Haussmannian thoroughfare created in the Second Empire, beginning in front of the Opéra Garnier on Place de l'Opéra and ending at Palais-Royal in the first arrondissement. In the vicinity of the Opéra Garnier is the capital's densest concentration of department stores and office buildings including the Printemps and Galeries Lafayette department stores, the Paris headquarters of BNP Paribas and American Express. The Palais Garnier, built in the later Second Empire period, houses the Paris Opera and the Paris Opera Ballet.

== 10th arrondissement ==
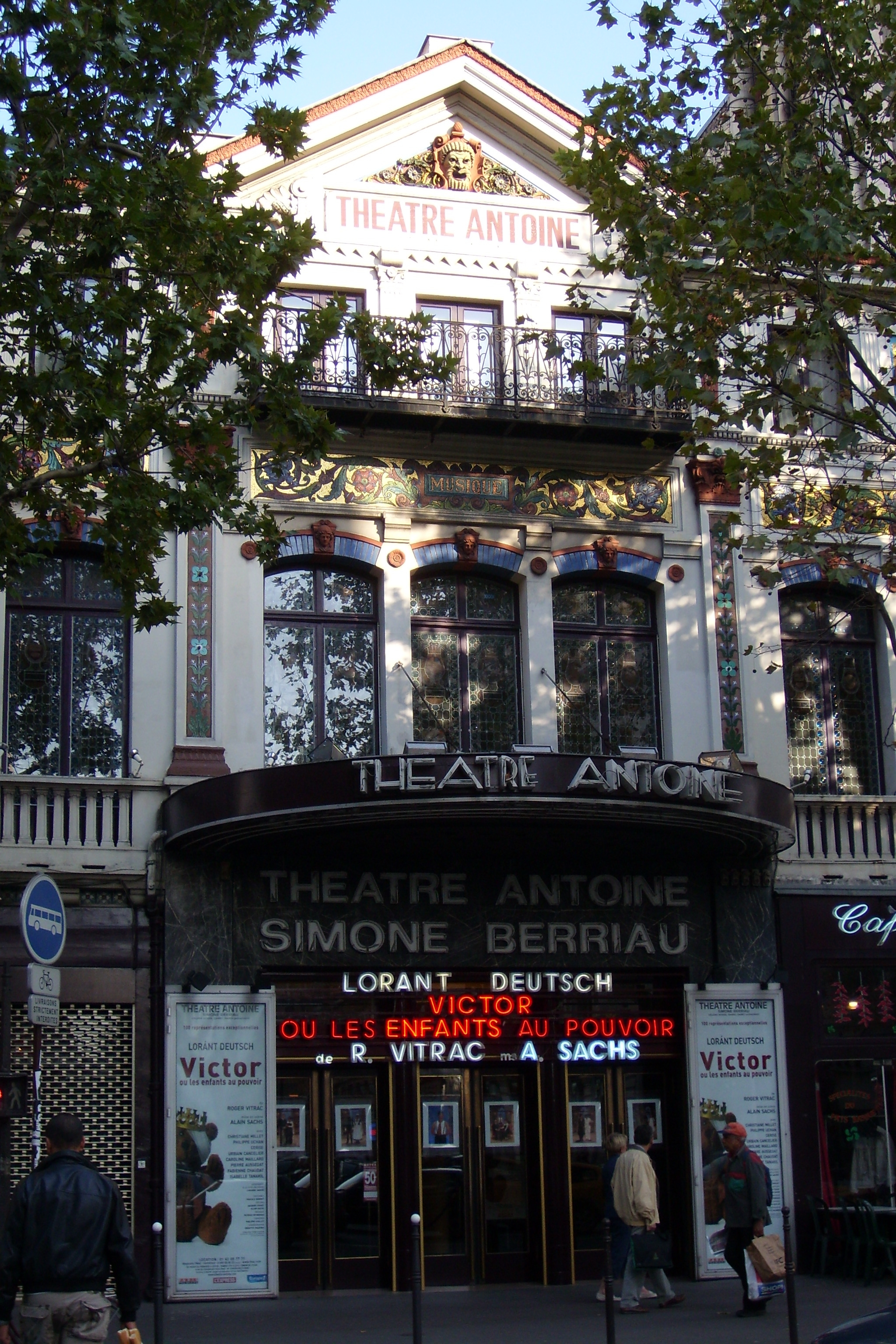
Théâtre Antoine-Simone Berriau

The 10th arrondissement lies northeast of the centre and is a continuation of the theatre district with many theatres including Théâtre Antoine-Simone Berriau, Théâtre des Bouffes du Nord, Théâtre de la Porte Saint-Martin, Théâtre de l'Ambigu-Comique, Théâtre de la Renaissance, Théâtre des Variétés-Amusantes and Théâtre du Gymnase Marie Bell. Roads running through the district include Boulevard de la Chapelle, Boulevard de Magenta Rue d'Abbeville, and Rue du Faubourg-Saint-Denis. Also of note is Musée de l'Éventail, Hôpital Saint-Louis, The Kurdish Digital Library, Lariboisière Hospital, Lycée Edgar-Poe, Prison Saint-Lazare and the Saint Laurent and Saint-Vincent-de-Paul churches. The Alhambra music hall opened in 2008.

== 11th arrondissement ==
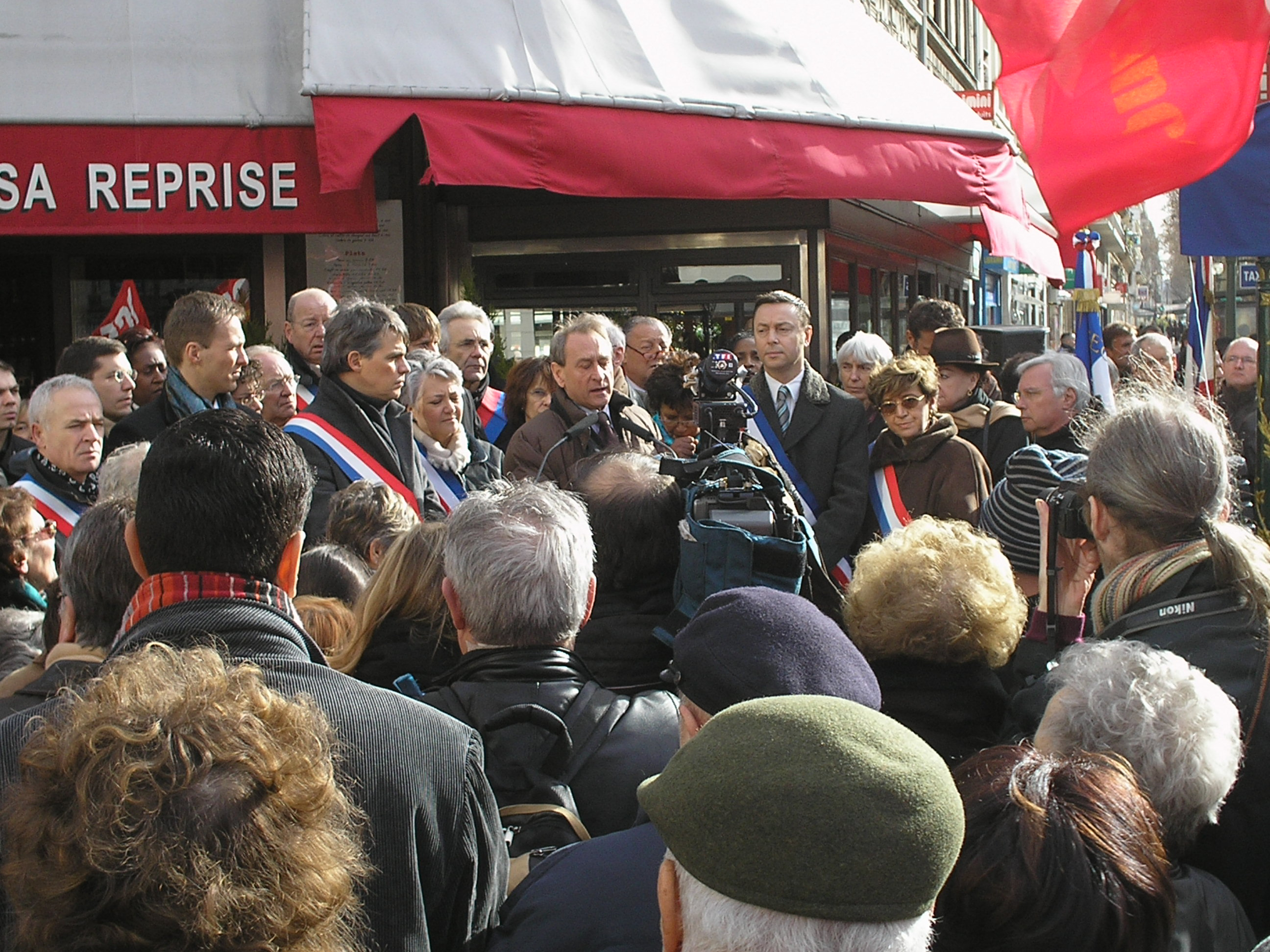
Mayor Bertrand Delanoë at Place du 8 Février 1962

The 11th arrondissement is located in eastern Paris, west of the 20th arrondissement. Roads running through the district include Boulevard du Temple, Boulevard Richard-Lenoir, Rue du Dahomey, Rue Oberkampf, and Rue Saint-Bernard. It contains the squares Place de la Nation, Place de la République, Place du 8 Février 1962, the theatres Bataclan, Théâtre des Folies-Dramatiques, Théâtre de l'Ambigu-Comique, Théâtre des Délassements-Comiques, and Théâtre des Funambules, the museums Musée du Fumeur and Musée Édith Piaf, and La Roquette Prisons.

== 12th arrondissement ==
Opéra Bastille

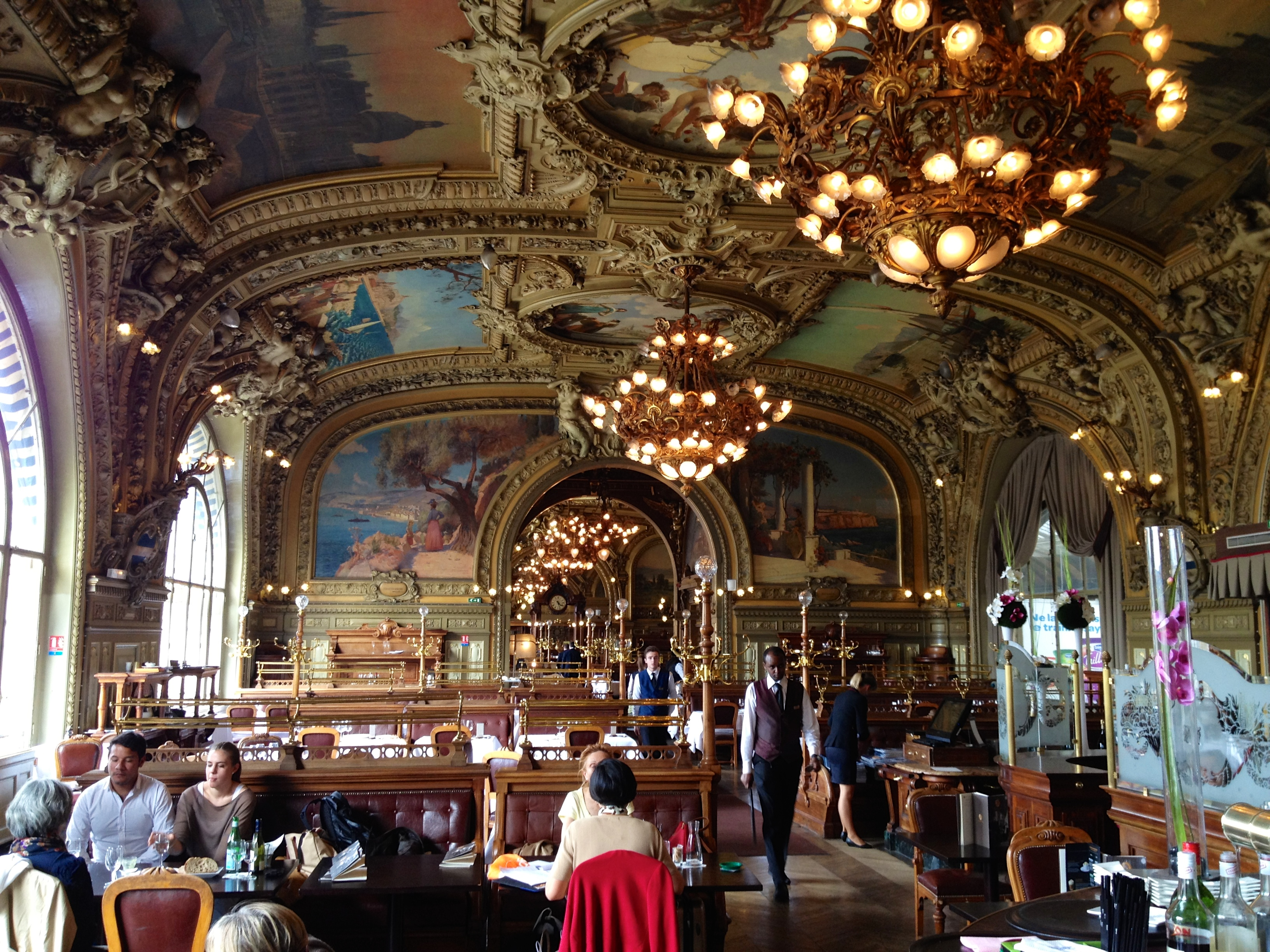
The dining room of the Train Bleu

The 12th arrondissement in the southeastern suburbs of Paris is separated from the 13th by the Seine with several bridges. The district contains the Place de la Bastille and Place de la Nation (bordering the 11th), Picpus Cemetery and Parc de Bercy, and the Boulevard de la Bastille runs through it. A 12th-century convent was located here, Saint-Antoine-des-Champs, and today the Buddhist temples Kagyu-Dzong and Pagode de Vincennes are located in the 12th arrondissement. Landmarks of note include Bassin de l'Arsenal, Bastille railway station, Palais Omnisports de Paris-Bercy and the restaurant Le Train Bleu. Opéra Bastille, the main facility of the Paris National Opera, was inaugurated in 1989 as part of President François Mitterrand's "Grands Travaux". Designed by Uruguayan architect Carlos Ott, it is located at the Place de la Bastille and houses a 2,700-seat theatre as well as smaller concert hall and a studio.

== 13th arrondissement ==
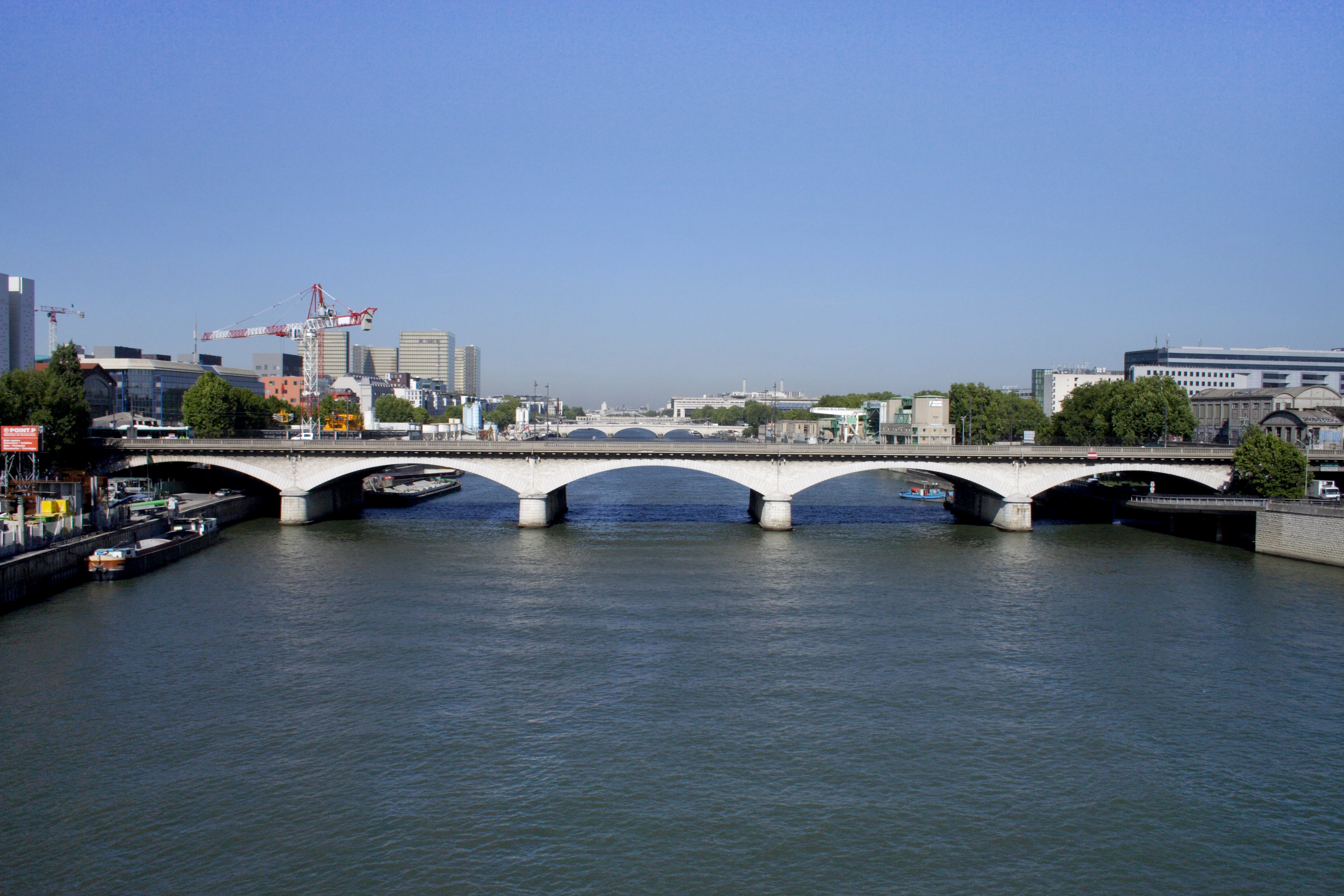
Pont National

The 13th lies in the south-eastern part of Paris. It contains the neighbourhoods of Chinatown, Floral City, Butte-aux-Cailles, and the Italie 2 shopping centre with some 130 stores. Institutions such as the Bibliothèque nationale de France and École Estienne are located here, as is Les Olympiades, Paris Store, Pitié-Salpêtrière Hospital, Place d'Italie, and Stade Sébastien Charléty. Sainte-Rosalie church was built in 1869 in honour of Sister Rosalie Rendu. The district is also known for its bridges such as Pont amont, Pont de Bercy, Pont de Tolbiac, and Pont National.

== 14th arrondissement ==
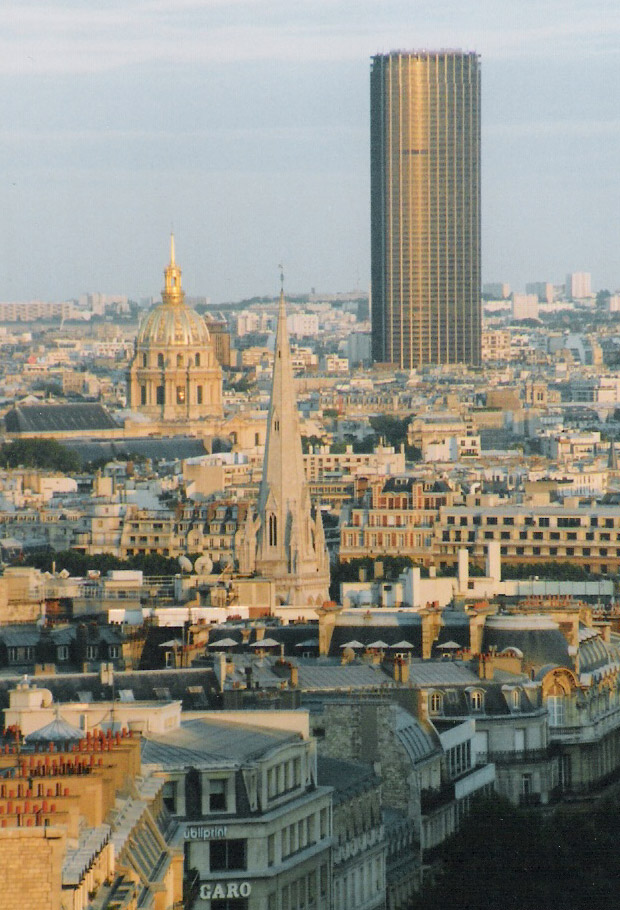
Tour Montparnasse

Montparnasse is a historic left bank area in the 14th arrondissement, the southern part of Paris, famous for artists' studios, music halls, and café life. The Montparnasse Cemetery, large Montparnasse – Bienvenüe Métro station, Théâtre Montparnasse, and the nearby lone Tour Montparnasse skyscraper are located there. Other landmarks include the Catacombs of Paris, École normale supérieure de jeunes filles, Hôpital Cochin, Hôtel de Massa, Le Dôme Café, La Santé Prison, and Échelles du Baroque, the latter of which is a residential building complex, completed in 1985 by the international team Ricardo Bofill in the baroque style.

== 15th arrondissement ==
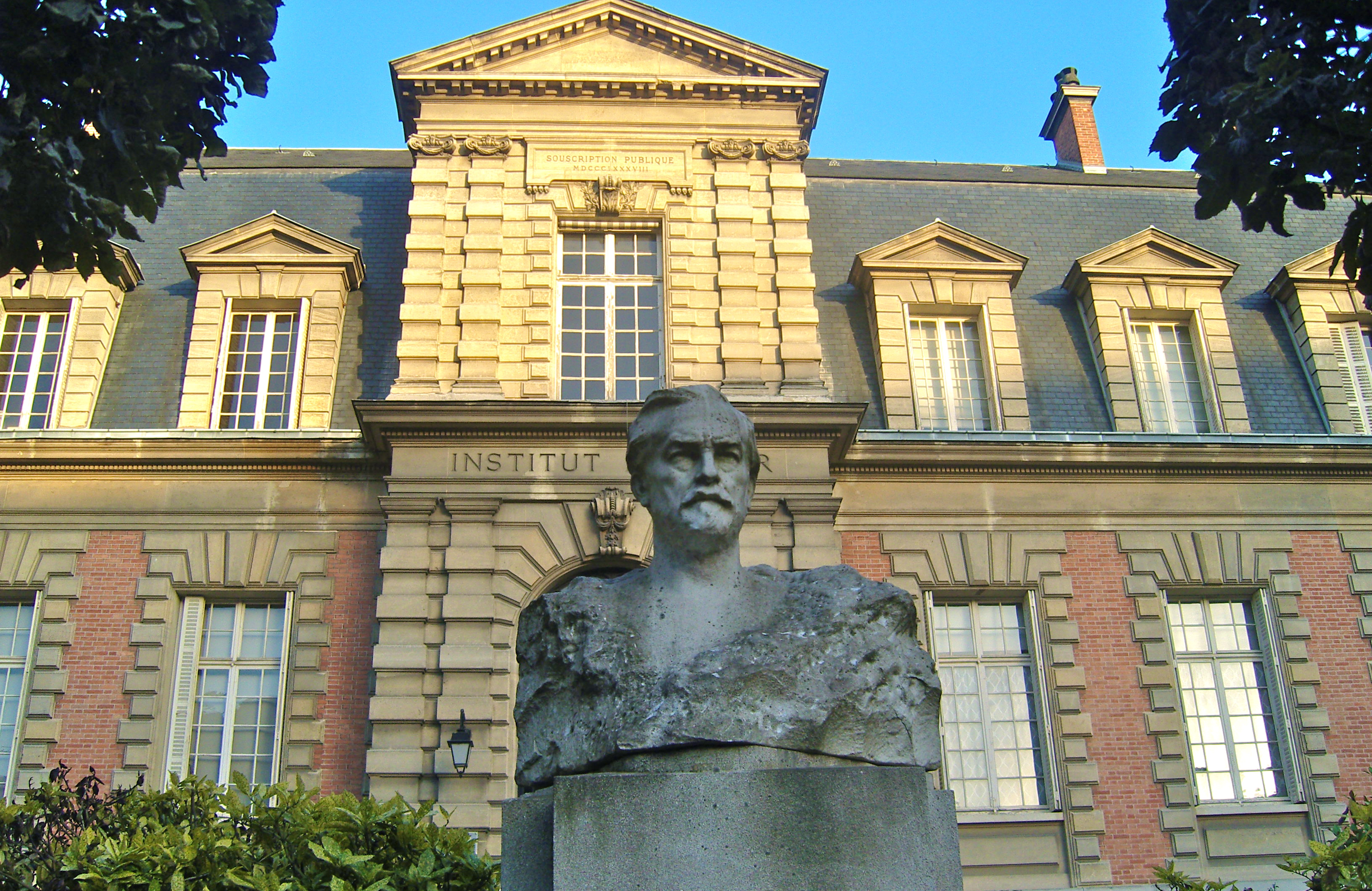
Pasteur Institute

The 15th arrondissement marks the southwestern part of the city. The Boulevard du Montparnasse with its Tour Montparnasse passes through here (to be noted: the panoramic restaurant on the 56th floor). Dominating the river is the Front de Seine district with the newly reopened Beaugrenelle Shopping Center. There are several bridges such as Pont de Bir-Hakeim, Pont de Grenelle where the replica of the Statue of Liberty is standing on Île aux Cygnes, Pont Mirabeau, Pont du Garigliano and Pont aval. A number of institutions are based in the 15th arrondissement, the Pasteur Institute, and research hospitals: Hôpital Européen Georges-Pompidou and Necker-Enfants Malades Hospital. Art Schools such as Académie de La Palette today, replaced by the Panthéon-Sorbonne University, Saint Charles Campus-Visual arts and aesthetics and École nationale supérieure des arts appliqués et des métiers d'art and Panthéon-Assas University-Law school - Vaugirard Campus. The International culinary school Le Cordon Bleu and Schiller International University are both located in the 15th arrondissement . Other places of interest include museums such as Musée Bourdelle, Musée Mendjisky (School of Paris), Musée Pasteur, Musée Jean Moulin, (French Résistance), Musée de La Poste and Musée du Montparnasse, Théâtre Silvia-Monfort near Parc Georges-Brassens, the Australian embassy and Japan cultural Center.

The French automobile company Citroën had several factories along the river, Quai André-Citroën. The modernist Parc André Citroën now lays in their place with the Ballon Generali in the center. The Palais des Sports was built in 1960 to replace the old Vel' d'Hiv and has hosted many notable music concerts over the years. Nearby, is the Paris expo Porte de Versailles, Paris convention Center.

Val de Seine, straddling the 15th arrondissement and the communes of Issy-les-Moulineaux and Boulogne-Billancourt to the south-west of central Paris is the new media hub of Paris and France, hosting the headquarters of most of France's TV networks (TF1 in Boulogne-Billancourt, France 2 in the 15th arrondissement, Canal+ and the international channels France 24 and Eurosport in Issy-les-Moulineaux), as well as several telecommunication and IT companies such as Neuf Cegetel in Boulogne-Billancourt or Microsoft's Europe, Africa & Middle East regional headquarters in Issy-les-Moulineaux.

== 16th arrondissement ==
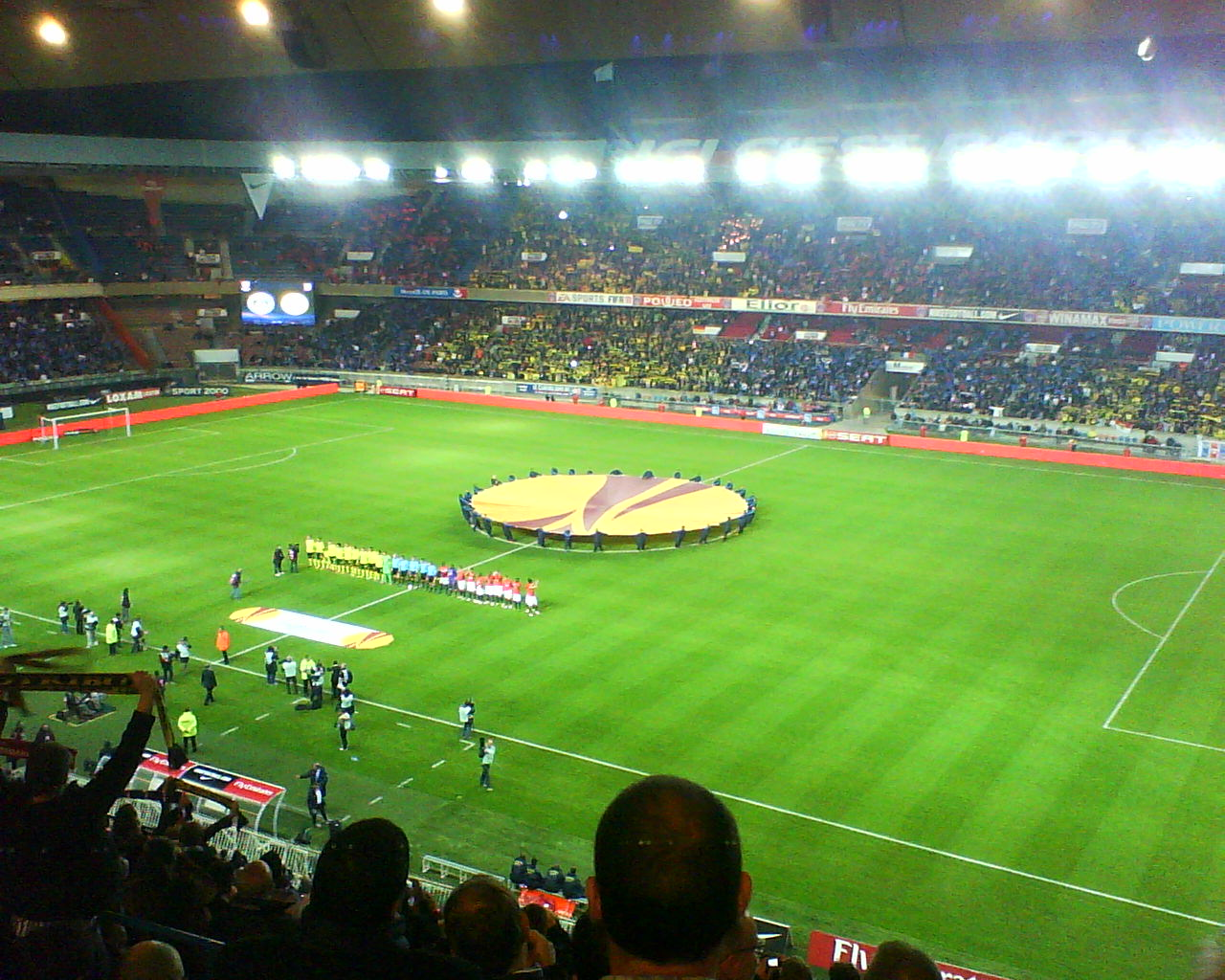
Paris Saint-Germain F.C. against Borussia Dortmund at the Parc des Princes

The 16th arrondissement is the largest district of Paris, marking the western side of the city, which extends beyond the left bank of the Seine. Paris Saint-Germain F.C. are based here and play their home games at the Parc des Princes and Stade Roland Garros hosts the annual French Open tennis tournament. Tennis Club de Paris, the Stade de Paris rugby club, Longchamp Racecourse, and the Auteuil Hippodrome, a horse racing venue established in 1873 and which hosted the equestrian events of the 1924 Summer Olympics are based in the 16th arrondissement. Avenues passing through the district include Avenue d'Iéna, Avenue de la Grande Armée, Avenue de Malakoff, Avenue Foch, Avenue Henri-Martin and Avenue Victor-Hugo. Like the 2nd arrondissement, the district has many museums, including Musée Clemenceau, Musée Marmottan Monet, Musée d'Art Moderne de la Ville de Paris, Musée national de la Marine, Musée d'Ennery, Musée d'Art Dentaire Pierre Fauchard, Musée de la Contrefaçon, Musée Galliera and Musée du Vin, and the Théâtre national de Chaillot. The Passy neighbourhood contains the Passy Cemetery. A number of organizations are based in the 16th arrondissement, including Radio France and the Organisation for Economic Co-operation and Development.

== 17th arrondissement ==
Place Charles de Gaulle and the Arc de Triomphe

The 17th arrondissement to the west of the 18th arrondissement marks the northwestern suburbs of the city. The avenues Avenue de la Grande Armée, Avenue de Wagram and Avenue des Ternes pass through the district. It has several squares, including Place Charles de Gaulle (with the Arc de Triomphe, bordering 16th and 8th), Place de Wagram, Place des Ternes and Square des Batignolles, the latter of which is in the neighbourhood of Batignolles, which also contains the Batignolles Cemetery and Parc Clichy-Batignolles. Other landmarks of note include the Académie d'Agriculture, Hyatt Regency Paris Étoile, Théâtre Hébertot and Palais des congrès de Paris.

La Défense, beyond the 17th arrondissement (straddling the communes of Courbevoie, Puteaux, and Nanterre, 2.5 km (2 mi) west of the city proper) is a key suburb of Paris and one of the largest business centres in the world. Built at the western end of a westward extension of Paris's historical axis from the Champs-Élysées, La Défense consists mainly of business high-rises, with most of the tallest skyscrapers in the Paris urban area, built around a pedestrian esplanade. Initiated by the French government in 1958, it now hosts 3,500,000 m^{2} (37,673,686 sq ft) of offices, making it the largest district in Europe developed specifically for business. Its most emblematic building, the Grande Arche (Great Arch), houses a part of the Ministry of Ecology.

== 18th arrondissement ==
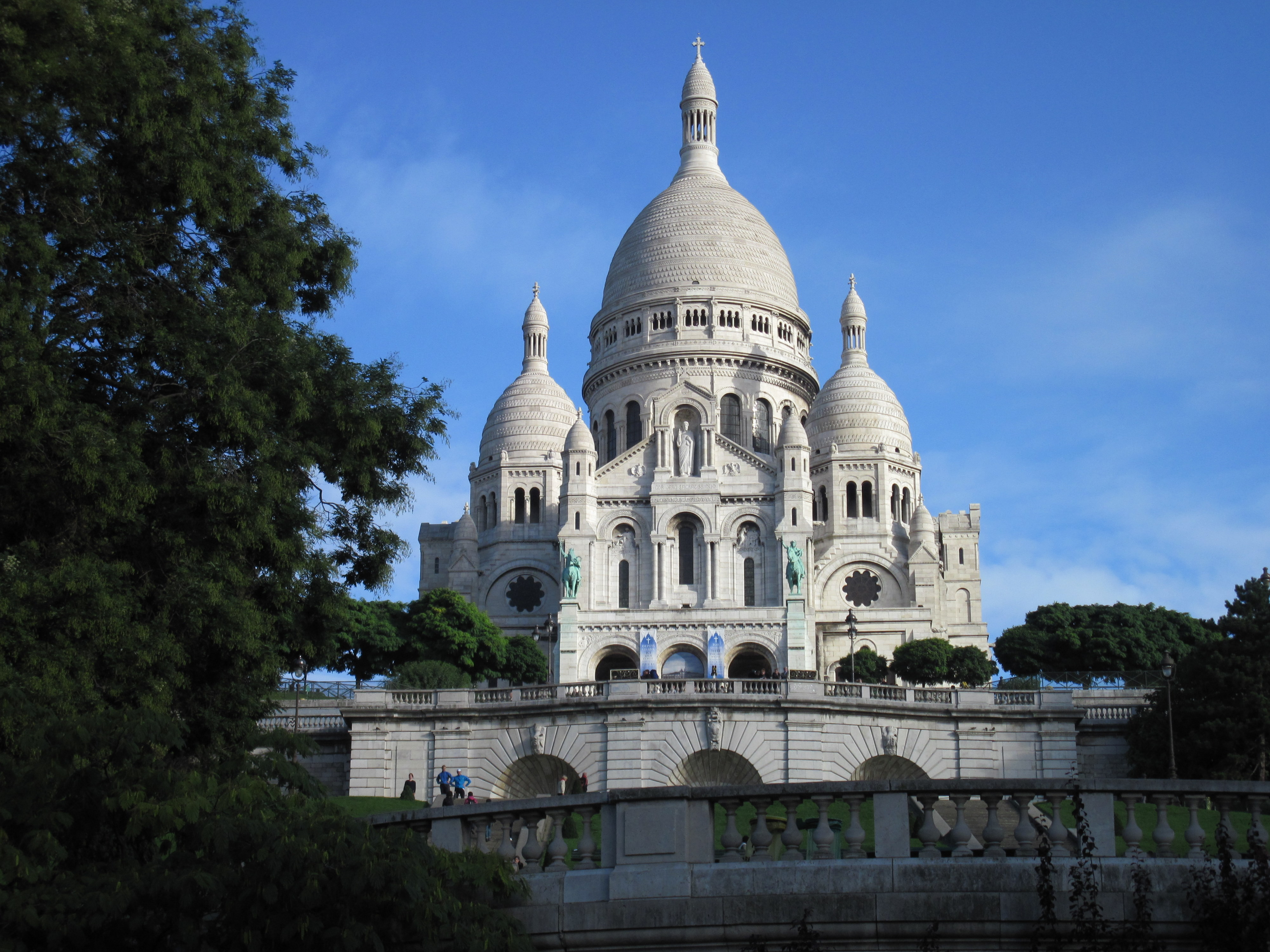
Basilique du Sacré-Cœur in Montmartre

The 18th arrondissement marks the northern suburbs of the city. Montmartre is a historic area on the Butte, home to the Basilique du Sacré-Cœur. Montmartre has always had a history with artists and has many studios and cafés of many great artists in that area. The boulevards Boulevard de Clichy, Boulevard de la Chapelle and Boulevard de Rochechouart pass through the district. Notable landmarks include the Académie de La Palette, Théâtre de l'Atelier, Cirque Medrano, Place de Clichy, Élysée Montmartre, Espace Dalí, Moulin Rouge, and Musée d'Art Juif. Plaine Saint-Denis (straddling the communes of Saint-Denis, Aubervilliers, and Saint-Ouen, immediately north of the 18th arrondissement, across the Périphérique ring road) is a former derelict manufacturing area that has undergone large-scale urban renewal since the 1980s, and contains most of France's television studios as well as some major movie studios.

== 19th arrondissement ==
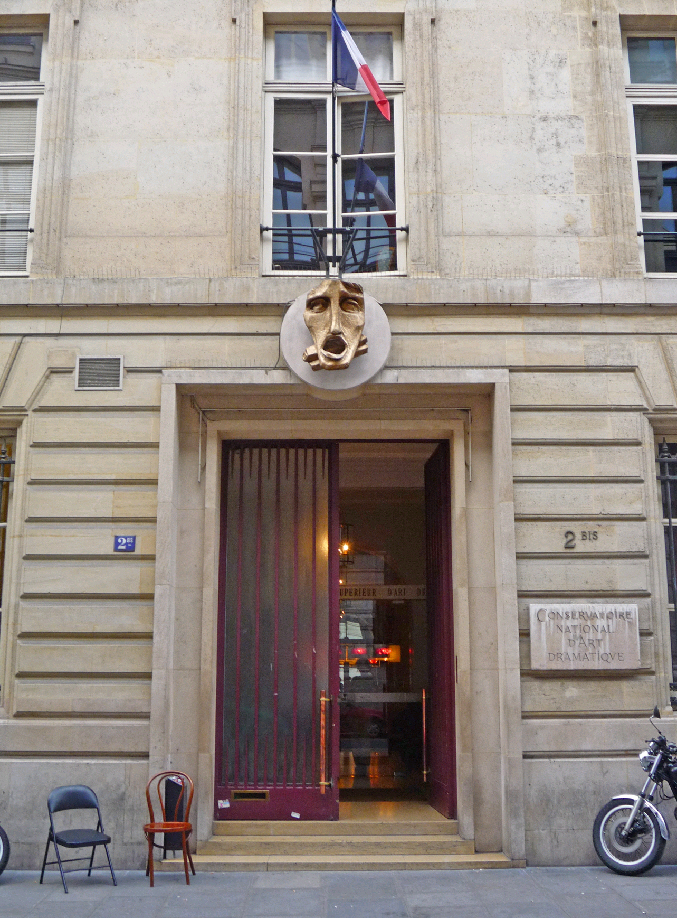
Conservatoire de Paris

The 19th arrondissement marks the northeast suburbs of Paris. It contains the Conservatoire de Paris, Cité de la Musique, Cité des Sciences et de l'Industrie, and the neighbourhood of La Villette, which contains the Grande halle de la Villette and Parc de la Villette. The Conservatoire, a prestigious music and dance school. was established in 1795, and in 1946 it was split into two Conservatoires. Several canals run through the 19th arrondissement including Canal de l'Ourcq and Canal Saint-Denis, and the Place de la Bataille-de-Stalingrad lies at their intersection, commemorating the Battle of Stalingrad. One of the Paris Métro stations Stalingrad is also named after it. The Zénith de Paris, one of the largest concert venues in Paris located here. Opened in 1984, it has a capacity of 6,293 people, and has hosted concerts of many of the top names in pop music.

== 20th arrondissement ==
The 20th arrondissement marks the eastern suburbs of the city and contains the neighbourhood of Belleville and also borders the commune of the same name. The neighbourhood of Belleville covers both of the 19th and 20th arrondissements, and was annexed to the City of Paris in 1860. During the first half of the 20th century, many immigrants settled there: German Jews fleeing the Third Reich in 1933, and Spaniards in 1939, and it became a "Jewish ghetto". Many Algerians and Tunisian Jews arrived in the early 1960s. Belleville is home to one of the largest congregations of the Reformed Church of France., and contains the Église Réformée de Belleville. Also of note is the Charonne quarter and its Église Saint-Germain de Charonne, the Théâtre national de la Colline (established in 1951), and Parc de Belleville, situated on the hill between the Parc des Buttes-Chaumont and the Père Lachaise Cemetery.

== See also ==
- List of tourist attractions in Paris
- Historical quarters of Paris
- List of historic churches in Paris

== Bibliography ==
- Ayers, Andrew (2004). The Architecture of Paris. Axel Mendes. ISBN 978-3-930698-96-7.
- Beevor, Antony; Cooper, Artemis (2007). Paris After the Liberation: 1944–1949: 1944–1949. Penguin Books Limited. ISBN 978-0-14-191288-2.
- Boogert, Kate van der (2012). Frommer's Paris 2013. John Wiley & Sons. ISBN 978-1-118-33143-9.
- Clark, Linda L. (2008). Women and Achievement in Nineteenth-Century Europe. Cambridge University Press. ISBN 978-0-521-65098-4.
- Fallon, Steve; Williams, Nicola (2008). Paris (7 ed.). Lonely Planet. ISBN 978-1-74059-850-7.
- Forsyth, David (1867). Marie Antoinette in the Conciergerie, a lecture.
- Frommer's (2012). AARP Paris 2012. John Wiley & Sons. ISBN 978-1-118-26621-2.
- Kaberry, Rachel; Brown, Amy K. (2001). Paris. Rough Guides. ISBN 978-1-85828-679-2.
- Labourdette, Jean-Paul; Auzias, Dominique; Chapalain, Chloé (12 November 2009). Petit Futé Paris sorties. Petit Futé. ISBN 978-2-7469-2640-0.
- Lawrence, Rachel; Gondrand, Fabienne (2010). Paris (City Guide) (12th ed.). London: Insight Guides. ISBN 978-981-282-079-2.
- Martin, Michel (2013). Windows 8: Le guide de référence. Pearson Education France. ISBN 978-2-7440-2543-3.
- Merritt, Giles (1982). World out of Work. Collins. ISBN 978-0-00-216634-8.
- Muirhead, Findlay; Monmarché, Marcel (1927). Paris and Its Environs. Macmillan & Company Limited.
- Newman, Peter; Thornley, Andy (2002). Urban Planning in Europe: International Competition, National Systems and Planning Projects. Taylor & Francis. ISBN 978-0-203-42794-1.
- Porter, Darwin; Prince, Danforth (20 August 2010). Frommer's Paris 2011. John Wiley & Sons. ISBN 978-0-470-90126-7.
- Reeves, Tom (2010). Paris Insights - An Anthology. Discover Paris!. ISBN 978-0-9815292-0-2.
- Rodgers, Eamonn J. (1999). Encyclopedia of Contemporary Spanish Culture. CRC Press. ISBN 978-0-415-13187-2.
- Rossiter, Stuart; Muirhead, Litellus Russell (1968). Paris. E. Benn.
- Rousseau, George Sebastian (2004). Yourcenar. Haus Bublishing. ISBN 978-1-904341-28-4.
- Rynn, Margie (16 March 2009). Pauline Frommer's Paris. John Wiley & Sons. ISBN 978-0-470-48528-6.
- Vlotides, Nina (2006). A Hedonist's Guide to Paris. A Hedonist's guide to... ISBN 978-1-905428-05-2.
