= Floral City, Paris =

Human settlement in France

Coordinates: 48.8322°N 2.3556°E

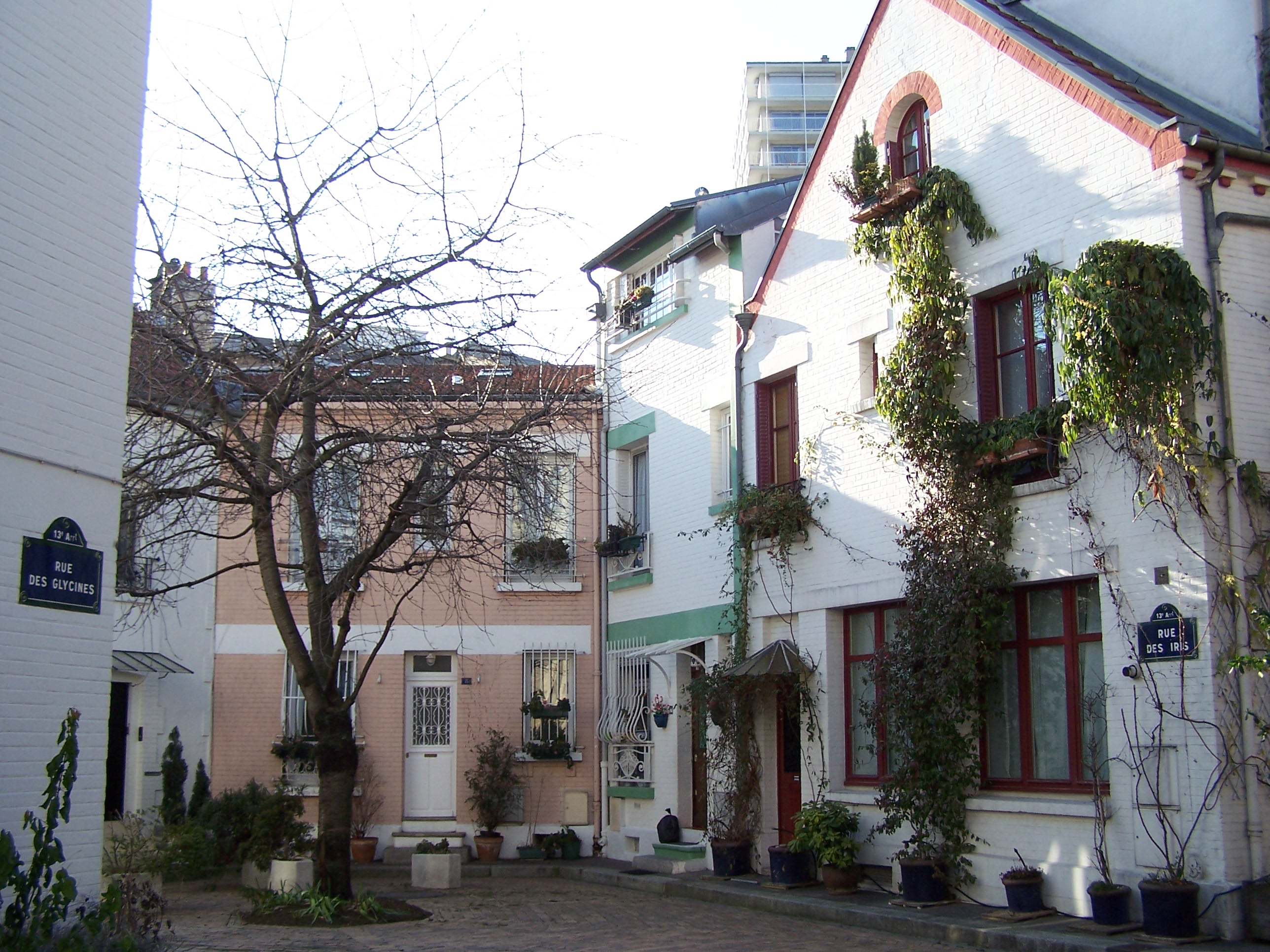
The Cité florale

The Floral City (French: Cité florale) is a residential area located in the 13th arrondissement of Paris, France. It forms a triangular area with individual houses. Each of the houses within the neighbourhood has its own flower garden, the streets are paved with cobblestones and are named after flowers.

The appearance of this area is unusual because it is surrounded by buildings much more modern.
