= Rue du Dahomey =

Street in Paris, France

Coordinates: 48°51′04″N 2°22′58″E

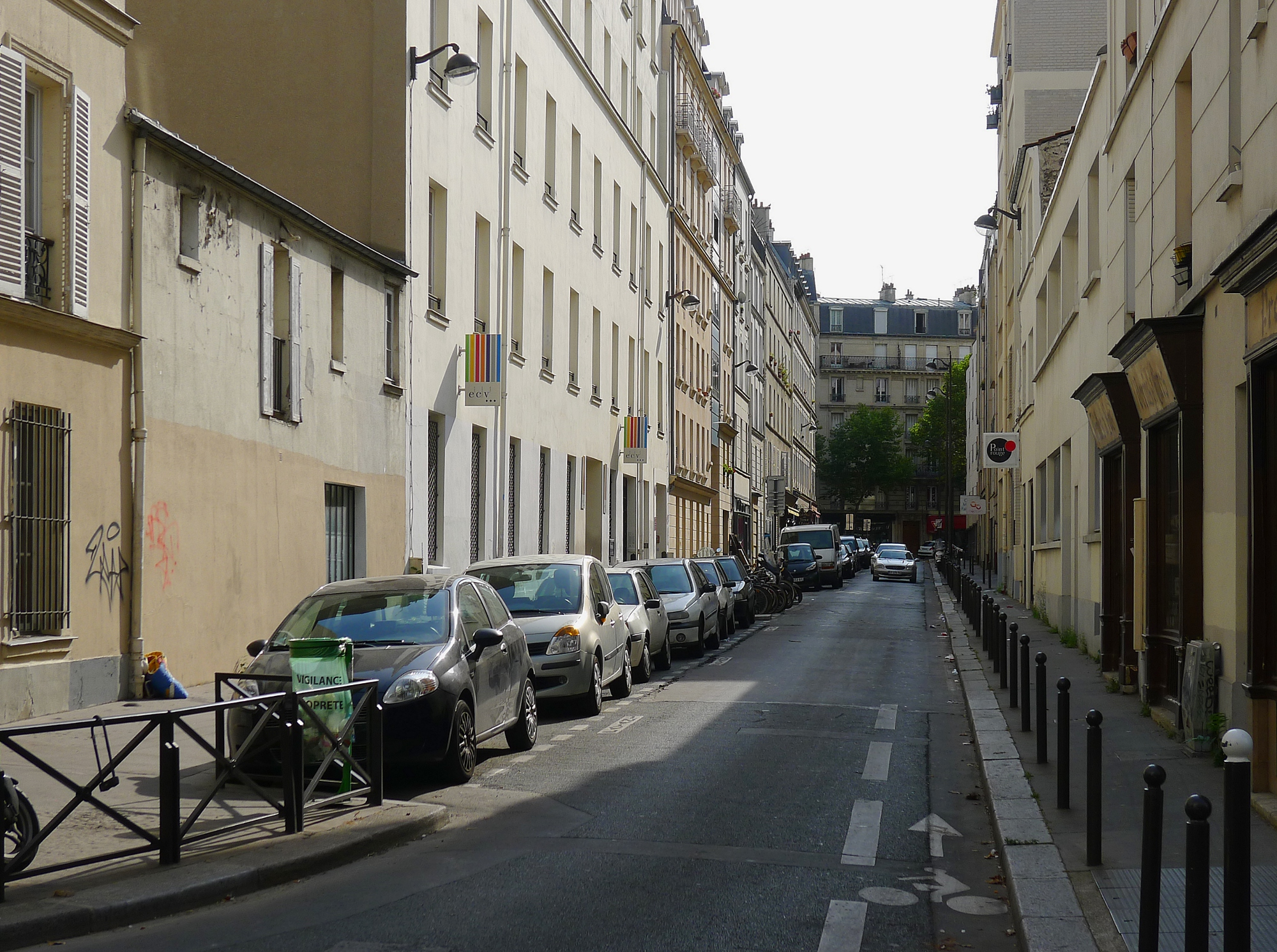
Rue du Dahomey in Paris

The Rue du Dahomey is a street in the 11th arrondissement of Paris. It is named for the former Kingdom of Dahomey, now Benin.
