= Paris Public Library =

- U.S. National Register of Historic Places
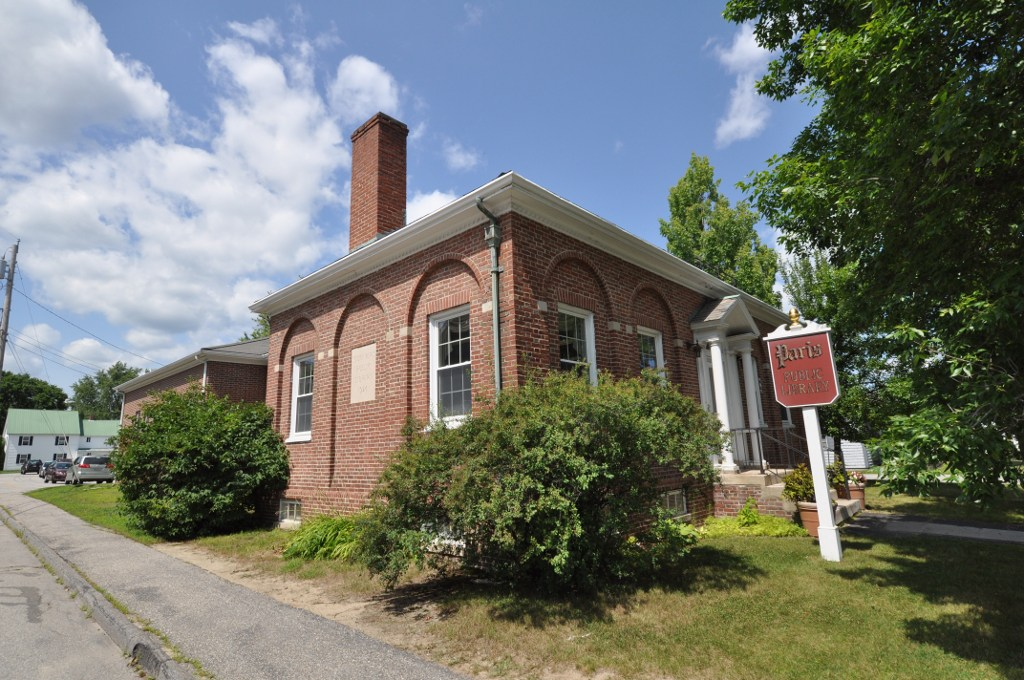

- Location within Maine Location within the United States
- Location: 37 Market Sq., South Paris, Maine
- Coordinates: 44°13′24″N 70°30′53″W
- Area: less than one acre
- Built: 1926
- Architect: John Calvin Stevens; John Howard Stevens
- Architectural style: Colonial Revival
- MPS: Maine Public Libraries MPS
- NRHP reference No.: 88003015
- Added to NRHP: January 5, 1989

The Public Library of Paris, Maine, is located at 37 Market Square in the town of South Paris, Maine. The original portion of its building, a Colonial Revival brick structure built in 1926, was one of the last designs of the Portland architect John Calvin Stevens, and was listed on the National Register of Historic Places in 1989.

== Architecture and history ==
The library is located in a brick building at the northeast corner of Church and Main Streets in South Paris, which is now designated Market Square. It is one story in height, five bays wide and three deep, and has a hip roof. The bays are characterized by recessed arched openings, most of which have sash windows in their centers. The central bay facing Church Street has no window, and is solid brick except for a terra cotta panel, and the central bay on the front facade has the main entrance, which is approached by a small flight of stairs with iron railings. It is sheltered by a gabled portico supported by thin Tuscan columns. The interior has two reading areas, each with a fireplace, a stack area, librarian's desk, and office. The basement, originally used for storage, was partially finished in 1962 to provide office spaces. A modern addition greatly expands the size of the building to the rear.

The history of libraries in Paris begins in about 1885, when a private subscription library was established in a commercial building. A campaign for a public library began in 1893, but it was not until the 1920s that sufficient funds were raised to build a permanent home. The subscription library was made free in 1905. Library trustees hired the firm of John Calvin Stevens, which then also included his son John Howard Stevens. Stevens had from early in his career designed public library buildings; this was one of a series of seven he designed in collaboration with his son, and one of has last commissions.

== See also ==
- National Register of Historic Places listings in Oxford County, Maine
