= Boulevard Voltaire =

Boulevard in Paris, France

Coordinates: 48.8585°N 2.3789°E

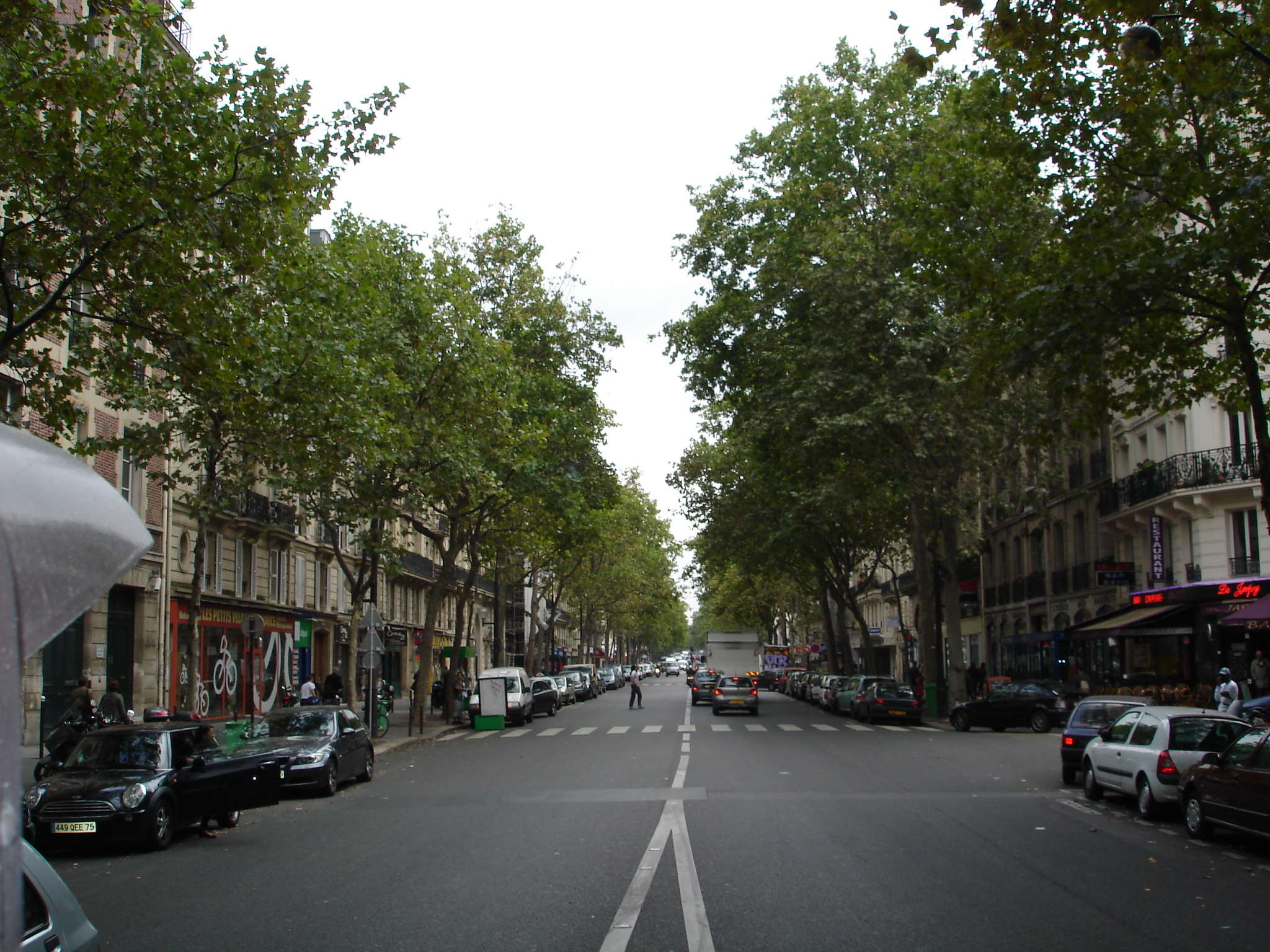
View of part of the Boulevard Voltaire

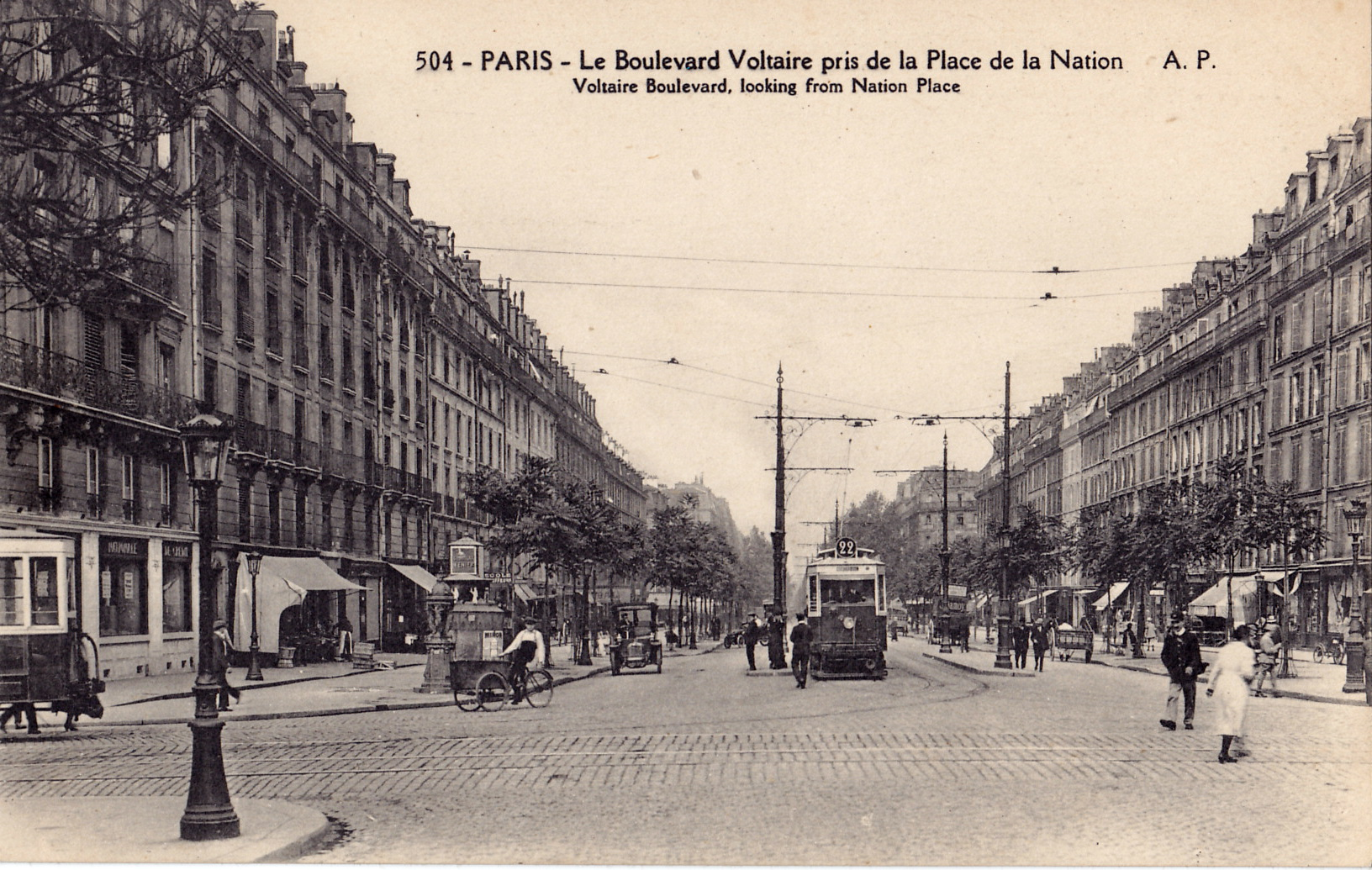
Boulevard Voltaire in the 1920s

The Boulevard Voltaire (French pronunciation: [bulvaʁ vɔltɛʁ]) is a well-known boulevard in the 11th arrondissement of Paris. It was created by Baron Georges-Eugène Haussmann during the reign of French emperor Napoleon III. Originally named the Boulevard du Prince-Eugène, it was renamed the Boulevard Voltaire on 25 October 1870 in honour of the French Enlightenment writer, historian, and philosopher Voltaire.

The boulevard is a great axis joining two historical squares associated with the French Revolution, the Place de la République and the Place de la Nation, and the boulevard is a main hub for left-wing demonstrations with the Republic and Nation squares as the focal points.

The boulevard is lined with platanus trees. Important establishments on the boulevard include the municipality of the 11th arrondissement of Paris, the Church of Saint-Ambroise and the Place Léon-Blum (formerly called the Place Voltaire). It includes a bust of the French politician and three-time prime minister after whom the square is named. The boulevard also has the Bataclan Theatre, built in 1864 by the architect Charles Duval. The boulevard, particularly between its cross-sections with the Boulevard Richard-Lenoir and the Place Léon-Blum is host to great textile firms. The odd side of the boulevard also has a great number of entertainment and video stores.

During the November 2015 Paris attacks, a suicide bomber blew himself up on the Boulevard Voltaire near the Bataclan.

== Crossing streets ==
The streets crossing the boulevard are: (if on one side only, direction mentioned)

- Rue Amelot (right)
- Rue Rampon (left)
- Rue Jean-Pierre-Timbaud - Rue de Malte
- Rue de Crussol
- Rue Oberkampf
- Boulevard Richard-Lenoir
- Rue Saint-Sébastien
- Rue Saint-Ambroise (left)
- Rue Lacharrière (left)
- Rue Popincourt (right)
- Rue du Chemin-Vert
- Rue Sedaine
- Place Léon-Blum (formerly Place Voltaire)
  - Avenue Parmentier (left)
  - Rue de la Roquette
  - Avenue Ledru-Rollin (right)
- Rue Richard-Lenoir (right)
- Rue Mercœur (left)
- Rue de Belfort (left); Rue François-de-Neufchateau (right)
- Rue Gobert (right)
- Allée du Philosophe (left)
- Cité de Phalsbourg (left)
- Rue de Charonne (in 2007, the intersection between the Boulevard Voltaire and the Rue de Charonne was renamed Place du 8 Février 1962)
- Rue Chanzy (right)
- Rue Léon-Frot (left)
- Rue Alexandre-Dumas (left)
- Rue des Boulets (right)
- Rue Voltaire (left)
- Rue Guénot (left)
- Rue de Montreuil
- Rue des Immeubles-Industriels (right)
