= Place du 8 Novembre 1942 =

Square in Paris, France

Coordinates: 48.8773°N 2.3493°E

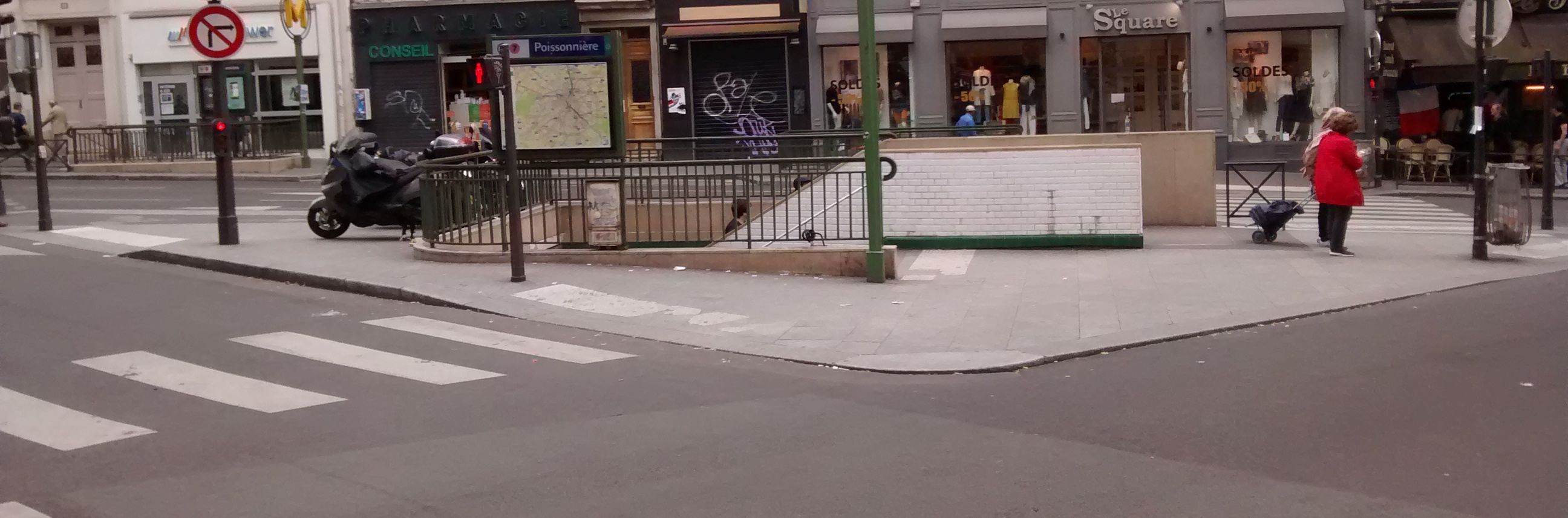
Place du 8 Novembre 1942

The Place du 8 Novembre 1942 is a public square located in the 10th arrondissement of Paris, at the intersection of the Rue La Fayette and the Rue de Chabrol, and limited by the Rue du Faubourg Poissonnière.

The name of the square commemorates the date, 8 November 1942, when in World War II the Operation Torch started, the British-American invasion of French North Africa during the North African campaign.
