= Hôtel Au Manoir Saint Germain des Prés =

Hotel in Paris, France

Coordinates: 48.8538°N 2.3323°E

The Au Manoir Saint Germain des Prés hotel is a 28-room hotel located at 153 Boulevard Saint-Germain in Paris in the Saint-Germain-des-Prés quarter.

Previously named Taranne Hotel, the hotel has existed since 1870 after the Haussmann's renovation of Paris when the Boulevard Saint-Germain has been created.

Owned by the Teil family since 1995, the hotel is a part of the small group Charming Hotels in Paris and also the international Best Western. L'Hôtel Left Bank Saint Germain des Prés is another hotel from the group Charming Hotels in Paris.
