= Place du 8 Février 1962 =

Square in Paris, France

- Location within Paris
- Length: 60 m (200 ft)
- Width: 60 m (200 ft)
- Arrondissement: 11th
- Quarter: Charonne
- Coordinates: 48°51′17″N 2°23′7″E

Construction
- Completion: 8 February 2007
- Denomination: 8 February 1962

The Place du 8 Février 1962 is a public square located in the 11th arrondissement of Paris, specifically in the Charonne district, at the intersection of the Rue de Charonne and the Boulevard Voltaire.

The name of the square commemorates the date, 8 February 1962, when the nine "martyrs of Charonne" were killed at the entrance of the nearby Metro station. The killings happened during the repression of a demonstration against the shadowy Secret Army Organization (OAS) and the Algerian War. According to the historian, Alain Dewerpe whose mother was killed, this event qualifies as a "state-sponsored massacre".

== Dedication of the square ==
The square was dedicated on 8 February 2007 by Bertrand Delanoë, the mayor of Paris, after sprays of flowers were deposited at the foot of a commemorative plaque installed inside the Metro station where the killings occurred. The memorial was sponsored by the General Confederation of Labor (CGT) of the RATP (Autonomous Transport Operating Company of Paris).

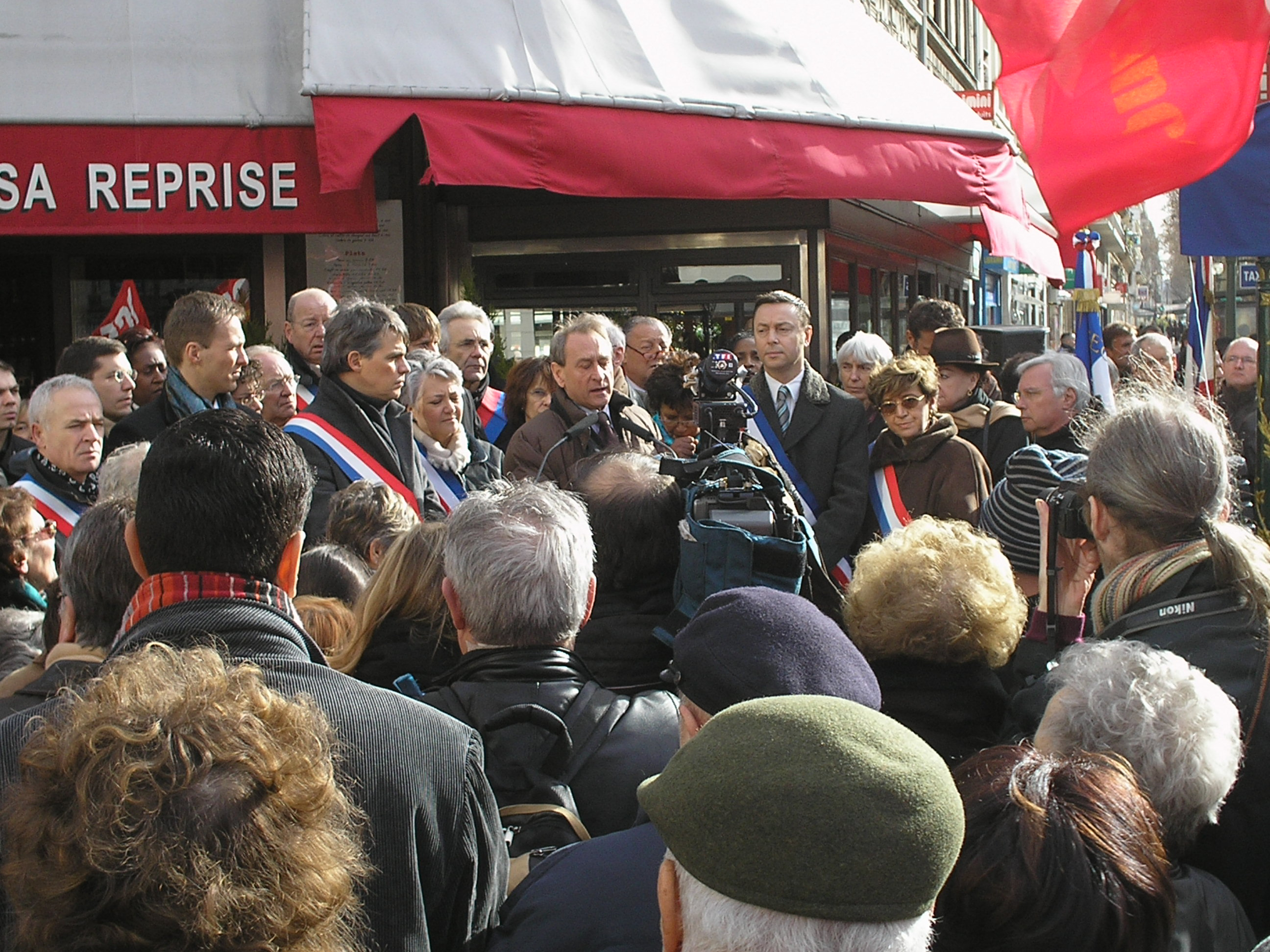
Oration by Bertrand Delanoë, Mayor of Paris

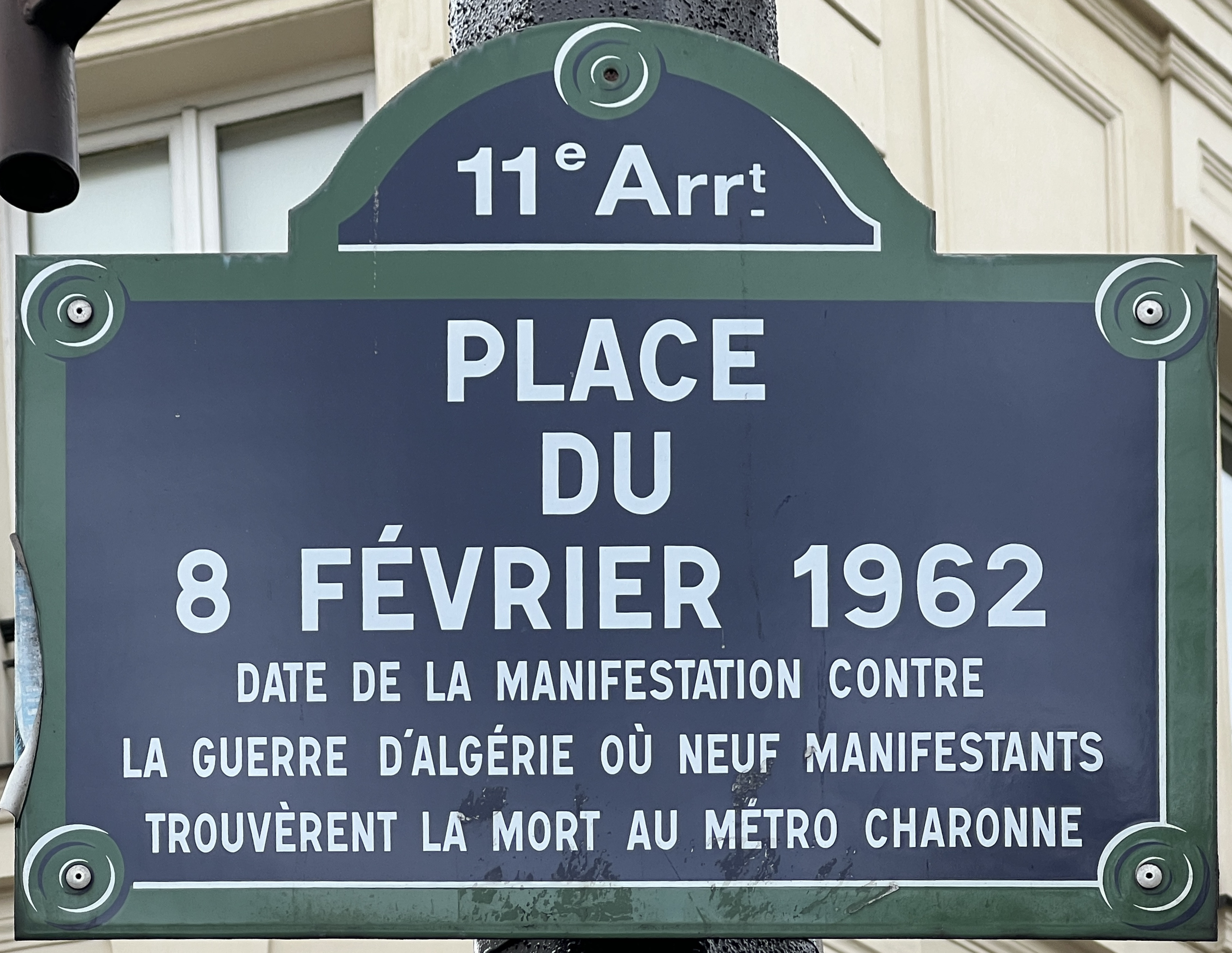
Street sign unveiled at the dedication of the square
