= Hotel des Trois Collèges =

Hotel in Paris, France

Coordinates: 48.8480°N 2.3423°E

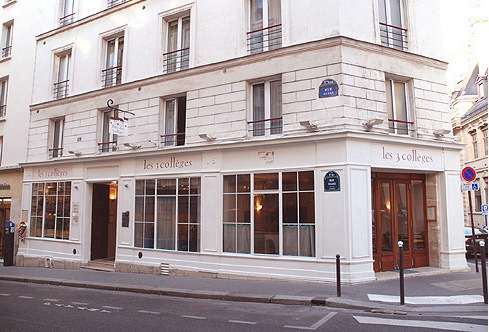

The Hôtel des Trois Collèges (French pronunciation: [otɛl de tʁwa kɔlɛʒ]) is located at Rue Cujas in the 5th arrondissement of Paris, in the heart of the Latin Quarter. Formerly called Hôtel de Flandre (until 1984), it is situated opposite the Sorbonne University.

== History ==
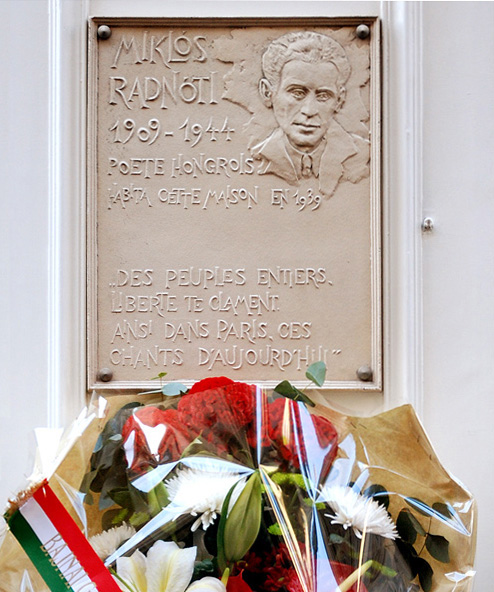
Miklós Radnóti

The hotel is at the exact location of the Cluny College (established in 1261 by the Order of Cluny), closed during the French Revolution and used as a studio by Jacques-Louis David where he painted The Coronation of Napoleon (1805–07). The Cluny College’s well is still visible inside the hotel.

Arthur Rimbaud describes the hotel’s courtyard in a letter to Ernest Delahaye (June 1872): "I have a pretty room, overlooking a bottomless courtyard, but three square meters wide. Rue Victor-Cousin is on the corner of the Sorbonne's square near the café du Bas-Rhin and leads to Rue Soufflot on the other end".

The French poet Raoul Ponchon spent the end of his life in the hotel.

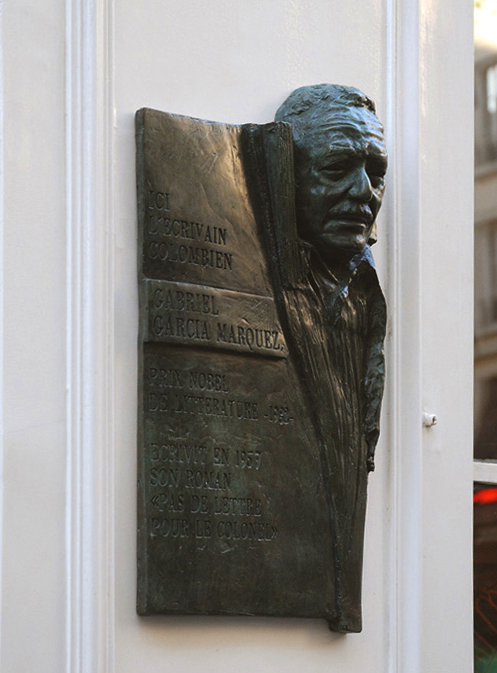
García Márquez

Miklós Radnóti lived in this hotel during the summers of 1937 and 1939. The Hungarian poet recalls this period in his poem "Paris" (1943): "Where the Boul’ Mich’ meets the Rue / Cujas the corner slopes perceptibly". A commemorative plaque by the hotel entrance celebrates the memory of Radnóti with a quotation from "Hispania, Hispania": "The Nations sing your destiny, O Freedom / This afternoon that great song flew for sure".

The Colombian writer Gabriel García Márquez wrote his novels No One Writes to the Colonel and In Evil Hour in the hotel between 1956 and 1957. By the hotel entrance, a commemorative plaque by Colombian sculptor Milthon pays homage to him.

The Peruvian writer Mario Vargas Llosa stayed at the hotel a few years later.

== Sources ==
- Dictionnaire historique des rue de Paris, Jacques Hillairet, Minuit (1985)
- Gabriel García Márquez : A Life, Gerald Martin, Grasset (2009)
- In the footsteps of Orpheus : The Life and Times of Miklós Radnóti, Zsuzsanna Ozsváth, Indiana University Press (2000)
- Rimbaud : Oeuvres complètes, Gallimard Pléiade (2009)
