= Hotel Napoleon =

Hotel in Paris

Hôtel Napoléon
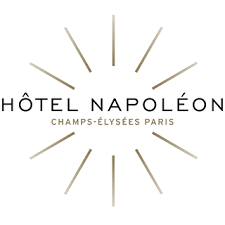

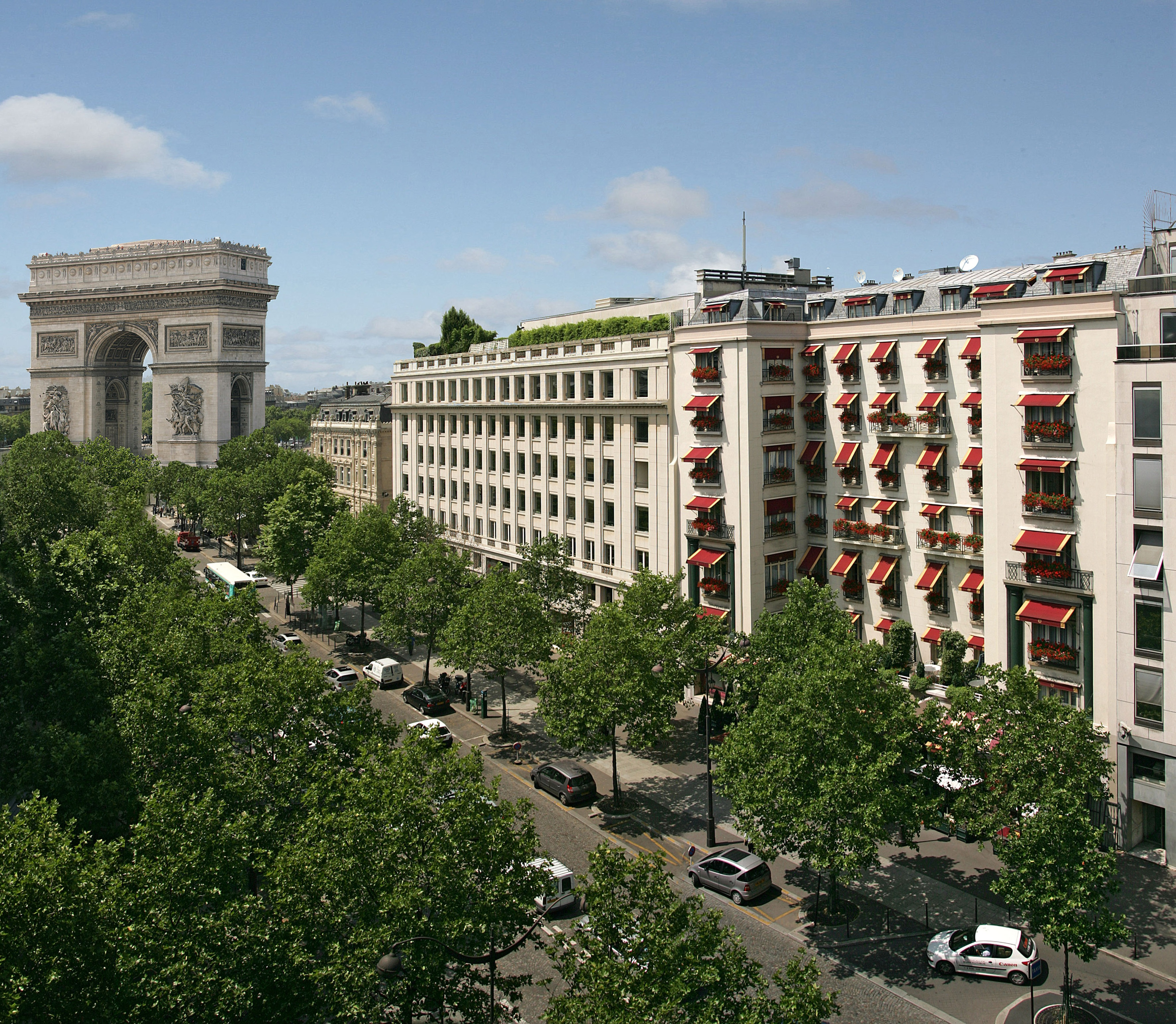
- Hôtel Napoléon Paris - Friedland Avenue, Paris
- Interactive map of the Hôtel Napoléon area

General information
- Location: Paris, France, 40, Friedland Avenue. 75008 Paris
- Opening: 1928
- Owner: Kliaguine family

Technical details
- Floor count: 7

Design and construction
- Architect: Henri Porteau

Other information
- Number of rooms: 39
- Number of suites: 57
- Number of restaurants: 1

Website
- http://www.hotelnapoleon.com

The Hôtel Napoléon (French pronunciation: [otɛl napɔleɔ̃]) is a five-star hotel in Paris. It is located in the immediate vicinity of the Arc de Triomphe, at number 40 Avenue Friedland, in the 8th arrondissement.

== History ==
In 1923 the Martinez group commissioned the architect Henri Porteau, to build a luxury home in the place of the old private residence of Count Tolstoi. Later on, the residence changed hands and was acquired by the Rothschild family. The Napoléon Bonaparte was opened in 1928 as a "hôtel de charme" (small distinctive hotel or boutique hotel).

Literary figures of the time frequented the hotel regularly. In 1929 the hôtel de charme became a hôtel de luxe (luxury hotel) and reached the grade of "petit palace". It was then named Napoléon Paris as a reference to its location right by the Arc de Triomphe. In March 2013, the French Agency of Tourist Development classified the hotel as a 5 star hotel.

Since its inauguration, the Napoléon has seen countless celebrities pass through its doors. Among these were Ernest Hemingway, John Steinbeck, Salvador Dalí, Errol Flynn, Orson Welles, Miles Davis, Josephine Baker, Ella Fitzgerald, all of whom, as well as many others, signed its Golden Book.

In a book collecting the memoirs of US Army veterans, Chicken Soup for the Veteran's Soul, Jean P. Brody tells that in 1945, when the war ended, her husband Gene stayed at the Napoléon and had a fond memory of the doorman Jean Fratoni, who was very kind to the American soldiers. Jean Brody tells that 40 years later, when her husband returned to Paris, he was very surprised to meet the same doorman who recognized him and said: "You were here when the war ended, didn't you?” Fratoni was extremely warm towards the Brodys, who were deeply moved.

The winner of the Nobel Prize in literature, the Peruvian Mario Vargas Llosa, tells about his "extraordinary" memory of his first trip to Paris, which he won at a literary contest organized by La Nouvelle Revue française: “I stayed at the Napoléon, and there I remember meeting Miss France for 1958, Annie Simplon.”

== A French–Russian fairy tale ==
One story involving the hotel connects Alexander Pavlovitch Kliaguine, a rich Russian businessman and a young Parisian, a student of literature (later to become the baroness de Baubigny). They fell in love instantly. As proof of his love, Kliaguine offered the young student the Napoléon Paris so that she would be able to entertain the high society of the time. The Parisian girl married the rich business man. They had a family and lived at the Napoléon Paris for many years. To this day, the Napoléon Paris continues to be owned by the Kliaguine family.

== Décor ==
The Napoléon Paris is the only hotel completely decorated with Napoleonic art, and furnished in the Directoire style. The hotel combines tradition and modernity, without forgetting a decidedly personal touch.

== Restaurant and Bar ==
Le Bivouac

== In film ==
The hotel was immortalized in the film Le Cave se rebiffe (1961), where the character played by Jean Gabin (Ferdinand Maréchal, better known as le Dabe) explains that he is staying at the Napoléon, “as always”.
