= Fort du Trou-d'Enfer =

Paris fortifications

- Part of Fortifications of Paris, Séré de Rivières system
- Marly-le-Roi, France
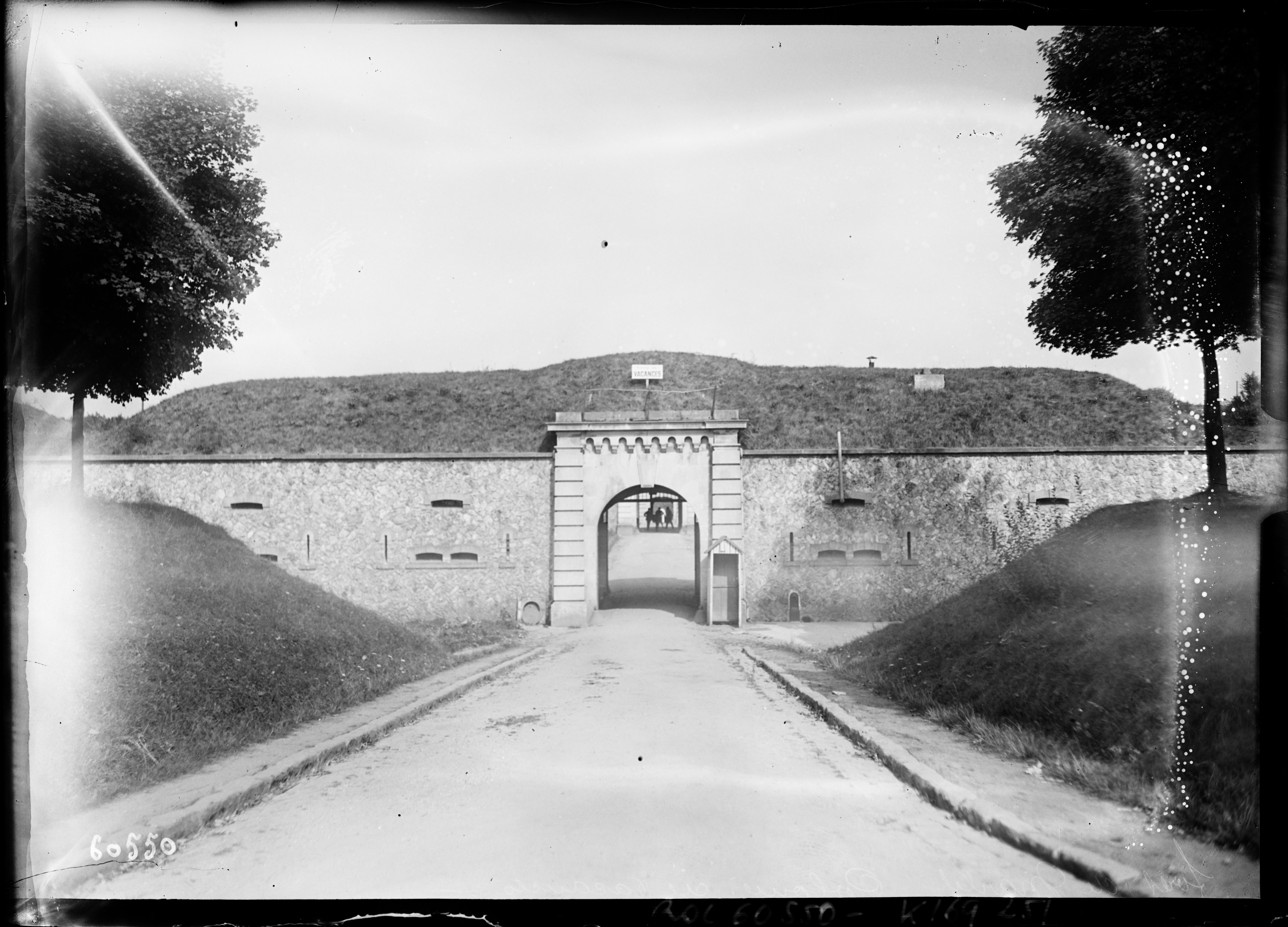

Site information
- Type: Fort
- Owner: French Ministry of the Interior
- Controlled by: France
- Open to the public: No

Location
- Coordinates: 48.84907°N 2.08656°E

Site history
- Built: 1878
- Materials: Stone, brick

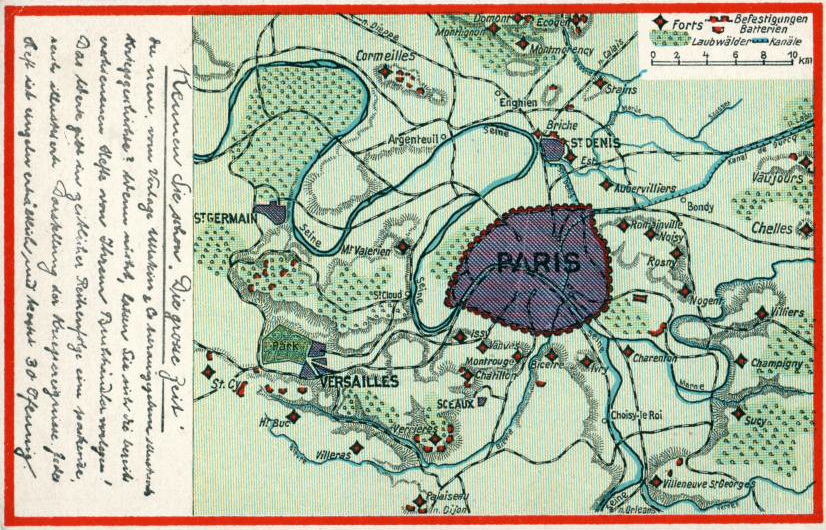
German post card showing the fortifications of Paris

The Fort du Trou-d'Enfer, also known as the Réduit du Trou-d'Enfer, is one of the fortifications of Paris, It is located in Marly-le-Roi, in the departement of Yvelines. The fort was built between 1878 and 1881 for a garrison of 800 men. It was termed a réduit for its position surrounded by several smaller batteries. The fort was occupied by the Germans during World War II, who blew up their ammunition when they evacuated the fort in August 1944, damaging the fort. The fort is named for the farm on whose land it sits, the ferme du trou-d'enfer, literally "Hellhole Farm."

== History ==
In 1870 France was partly occupied by the Prussian Army. Following this defeat, France put in place the Séré de Rivières system of fortifications to modernize its fortifications and to adjust its defensive strategy to the new borders imposed in 1871. The portion of the system surrounding Paris amounted to 18 forts, 5 redoubts and 34 batteries constructed between 1874 and 1881, of which the Fort du Trou d'Enfer is a part.

OAS members Albert Dovecar and Claude Piegts were executed at the Fort du Trou-d'Enfer in 1962.

The fort is presently assigned to the French National Forests Office and is not open to the public. The ONF operates a pheasant hatchery on the site of the fort for the grounds of the nearby French Presidential retreat.

== See also ==
- Fortifications of Paris in the 19th and 20th centuries

Other fortifications in Yvelines:

- Batterie de Bouviers
- Batterie du Ravin de Bouviers
- Fort du Haut-Buc
- Fort de Saint-Cyr
- Fort de Bois-d'Arcy
