= Reduit (disambiguation) =

Reduit or Réduit may refer to:

- Reduit - a fortified structure such as a citadel
- Réduit, Moka - a suburb in the village of Moka, Mauritius
- National Redoubt (Belgium) (French: Réduit national) - a defensive belt of fortifications in Belgium
- Fort du Trou-d'Enfer (a.k.a. Réduit du Trou-d'Enfer) - one of the fortifications of Paris
- Réduit (Switzerland) - the Swiss National Redoubt
