= Fort de Villiers =

19th c. French fort near Paris

Coordinates: 48°50′0″N 2°33′20″E

- Part of Fortifications of Paris, Séré de Rivières system
- Villiers-sur-Marne, France
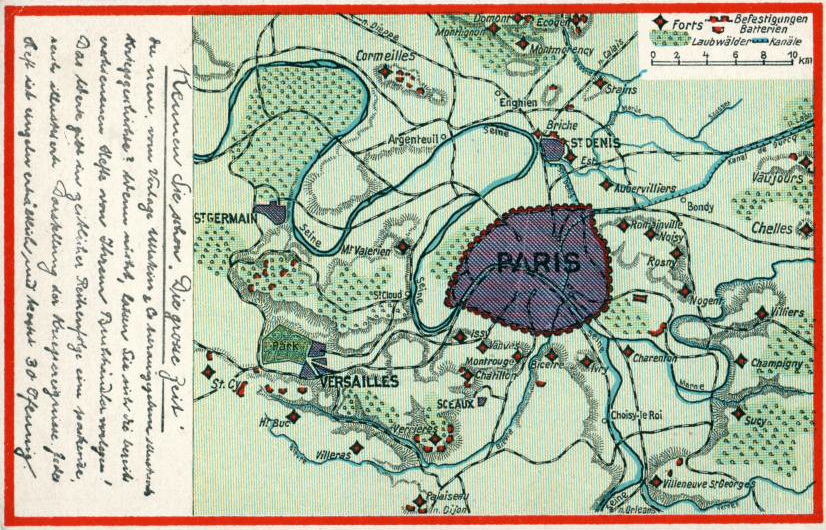
- German post card showing the fortifications of Paris

Site information
- Type: Fort
- Owner: Noisy-le-Grand
- Controlled by: France
- Condition: Under restoration

Location
- Location within Paris and inner ring

Site history
- Built: 1878
- Battles/wars: Siege of Paris

Fort de Villers was built following the Franco-Prussian War to defend Paris. Located to the east of Paris in Villiers-sur-Marne, the fort was part of an outer ring of eighteen major fortifications built in response to improvements in the range and effectiveness of artillery since the construction of the Thiers fortifications of the 1840s. It was built in accordance with improved principles of fortification developed for the Séré de Rivières system.

The Fort de Villiers was built between 1878 and 1880 at an elevation of 111 meters, overlooking the Marne to the north and a rail line to the south, and was intended to deny the use of the height to an enemy. The fort was originally armed with eighteen long-range guns, ten smaller guns for the caponiers, and three mortars. Pre-surveyed fields of fire covered the neighboring Fort de Champigny at 3500m and the Fort de Chelles, 6200m away. The fort received 75mm anti-aircraft guns in 1915.

The Fort de Villiers was the property of the Ministry of Defense until July 2001, when it was transferred to the community of Noisy-le-Grand, one of a series of new towns constructed around Paris. The fort covers seven hectares on the south side of A4 autoroute. It is linked to the town center of Noisy-le-Grand by a bridge over the autoroute. Until 2007 the fort housed community sports organizations. However, access to the fort has since been prohibited due to the state of the access bridge and the numerous dead trees resulting from the windstorms of late 1999. The Association de Sauvegarde du Fort De Villiers (ASFV) was established in 2008 to document and promote the preservation of the fort. It remains closed to the public.

== See also ==
- Fortifications of Paris in the 19th and 20th centuries
