= Fort de Cormeilles-en-Parisis =

- Part of Fortifications of Paris, Séré de Rivières system
- Cormeilles, France
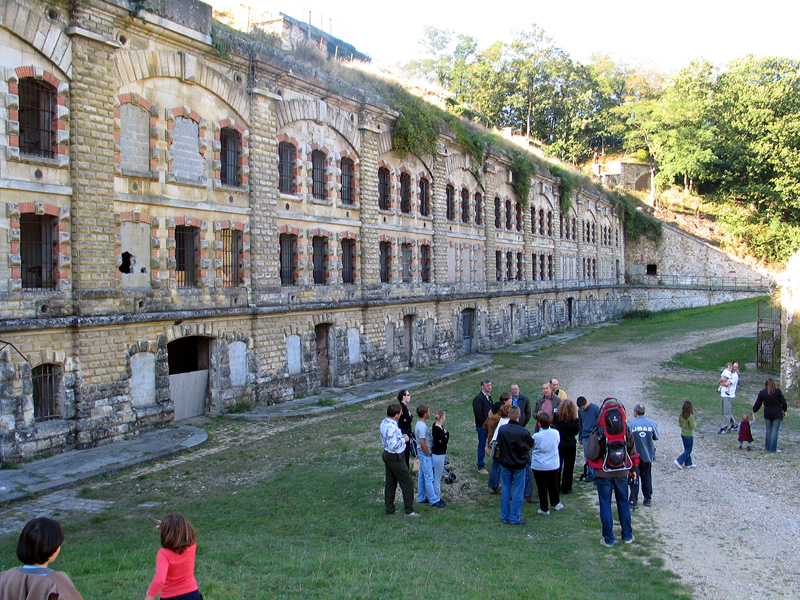

Site information
- Type: Fort
- Owner: Île de France
- Controlled by: France
- Open to the public: Yes

Location
- Location within Île-de-France (region)
- Coordinates: 48.98373°N 2.1958°E

Site history
- Built: 1874
- Materials: Stone, brick

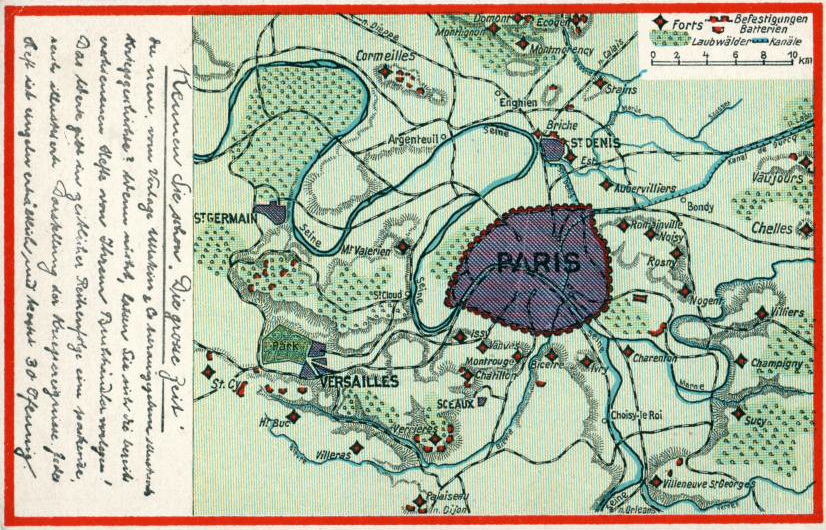
German post card showing the fortifications of Paris

The Fort de Cormeilles-en-Parisis was constructed between 1874 and 1877 as part of a new plan for the defense of Paris developed by General Raymond Adolphe Séré de Rivières, near the town of Cormeilles-en-Parisis. During the Franco-Prussian War, German troops had used the hill upon which the fort sits as a spotting and firing location, ideal for the siting of new rifled guns whose range was increased over old-fashioned smooth-bore guns. These weapons could attack Paris from Cormeilles, so a new outer ring of forts had to be built outside the first ring of forts built in 1840–1860 to deny the area to enemy gunners. The Séré de Rivières system was designed as a response to these technological innovations, and to the loss of French territories in Alsace and Lorraine.

== Description ==
The trapezoidal fort controls the lower Seine valley and the railway line to Pontoise. The walled fort was surrounded by a ditch defended by two double caponiers and an aileron. Entry was over a laterally-rolling bridge. The Fort de Cormeilles was armed with 64 guns, served by 1132 men, 36 officers and 14 horses, and could operate independently for three months. The new fort cost 3.3 million francs d'or. However, as one of the first of the Séré de Rivières system forts, it was built in brick and stone, with an earthen shield. This construction could not withstand new high-explosive shells that were developed in the 1870s, rendering the fort effectively obsolete without concrete reinforcement. This fort was never upgraded.

The fort features a chapel, complete with traceried windows, and a monumental three-story caserne. The façades feature an unusual amount of detail and ornamentation.

Six detached batteries and one redoubt supported the fort from the rear:

- Batteriedu Moulin de Risquetout
- Batterie de la Borne de Marbre
- Batterie de l'Étang
- Batterie du Ront-Point
- Batterie du Château-Rouget
- Batterie des Cotillons
- Redoute de Franconville

Another battery, the Batterie du Belvedere was located towards the front on the fort's glacis, with the Batterie de la Petit Montagne on the opposite side.

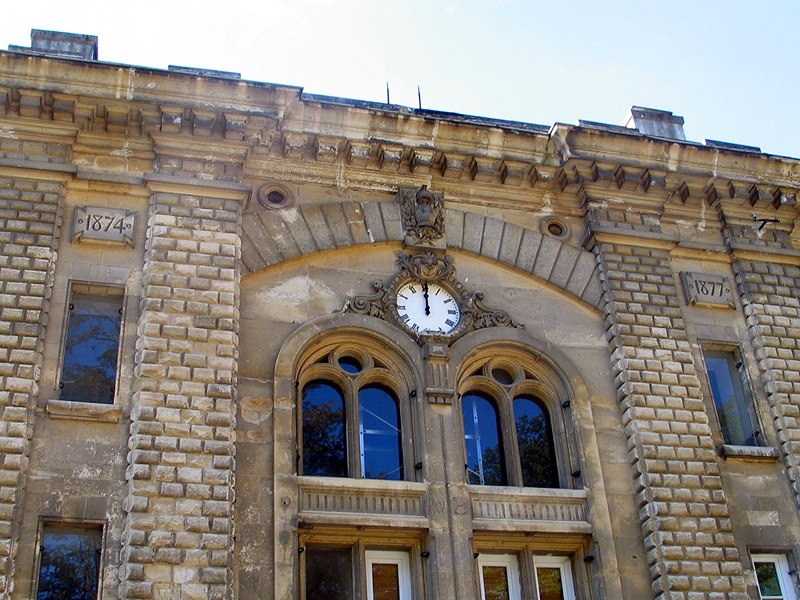
Chapel windows

== History ==
A 1911 project proposed a 75 mm gun turret and two machine gun turrets, as well as a protected 155 mm gun battery, never realized. In 1914 the fort was equipped with 75 mm anti-aircraft guns to counter Zeppelin raids against Paris. The anti-aircraft artillery was upgraded in the early 1930s with four new 75 mm guns, replaced by German 20 mm guns during German occupation.

After 1940 the fort was used by the German occupiers as an ammunition depot for the German navy. Following World War II the fort was used to lodge members of the French Forces of the Interior (FFI), then as a prison until 1956. From 1956 the fort was used as lodging for prison workers at nearby facilities, such as the Prison de Fresnes. Housing was built on the surface of the fort, and the complex featured a nursery school. The last families, principally North Africans and the family of the fort's keeper, left the fort at the beginning of the 1970s. From 1965 to 1997 the fort was used as a commando training center.

The Fort de Cormeilles is now the property of the Green Space Agency of the Île-de-France regional government. Preservation work is in the hands of the Association des Amis du Fort de Cormeilles, a volunteer group, which encourages the use of the facility by artists and by television and movie studios. Public visits are available every month and on special occasions.

== Cinema ==
The Fort de Cormeilles is regularly used as a backdrop for films and television. Films that used the fort include L'Autre Dumas, The Blood of Others, Triple Cross and The Night of the Generals.

== See also ==
- Fortifications of Paris in the 19th and 20th centuries
