= Fort de Bois-d'Arcy =

- Part of Fortifications of Paris, Séré de Rivières system
- Bois-d'Arcy, Yvelines, France
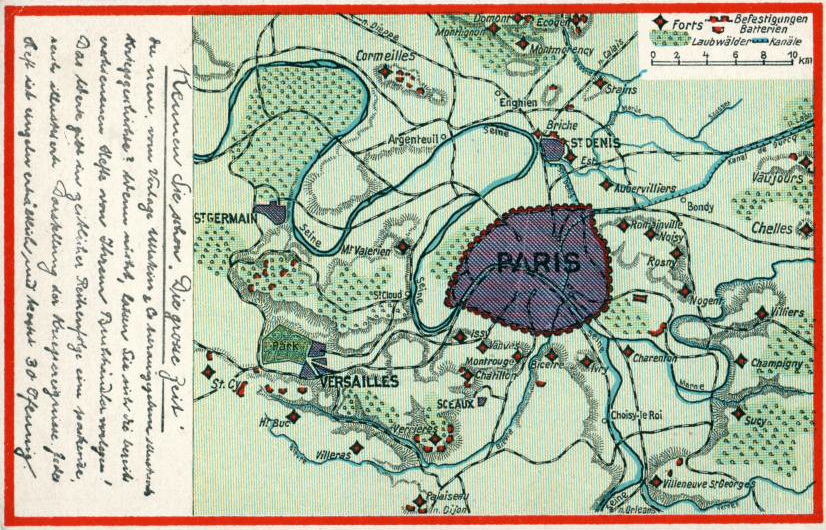
- German postcard of the fortifications of Paris with Bois-d'Arcy part of St. Cyr

Site information
- Type: Fort
- Owner: Ministry of Culture
- Controlled by: France
- Condition: Archives du Film du CNC

Location
- Coordinates: 48.793238°N 2.031623°E

Site history
- Built: 1874
- Battles/wars: World War II

The Fort de Bois-d'Arcy (French pronunciation: [fɔʁ də bwa daʁsi]), also called the Batterie de Bois-d'Arcy ([batʁi-]), is one of the forts constructed at the end of the 19th century to defend Paris. It is located in the commune of Bois d'Arcy in the Yvelines département of France. The fort is located in the southern part of the town to the south of Route nationale 12. It is now the home of the French national film archives, the Centre national de la cinématographie.

== History ==
Built between 1874 and 1881, the fort was planned to reinforce the western fortifications of Paris. The southwestern forts were designed to cover the approach of a relieving army from the western portions of France. The Bois-d'Arcy fort protected the neighboring Fort de Saint-Cyr, Versailles and the Camp de Satory, covering the Trappes valley and railway lines from Le Havre and Tours.

During World War II the fort was occupied by German forces. Before leaving, the Germans blew up the front of the fort in 1944.

== Film depository ==
During the 1960s the fort was placed at the disposal of the Ministry of Culture and was used by the Centre national de la cinématographie from 1969 as a storage center for nitrate-based films. It has since been designated a depository for all French films and is involved in the digitization of movies for digital preservation. It is classed as a Monument historique, designated on 15 February 1991.

== See also ==
- Séré de Rivières system
- Fortifications of Paris in the 19th and 20th centuries
