= Fort Neuf de Vincennes =

Fort in Paris

- Part of Thiers fortifications of Paris
- Vincennes, France
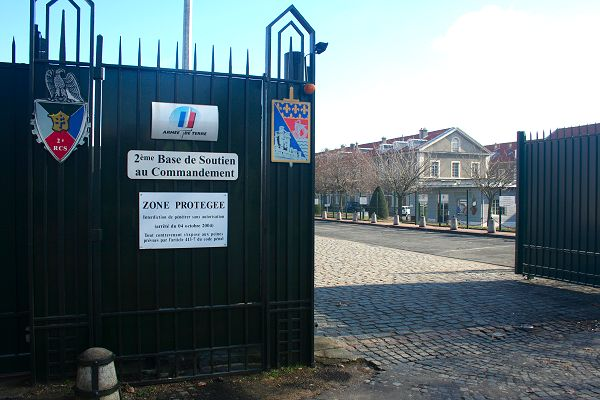
- Entrance gate

Site information
- Type: Fort
- Owner: Ministry of Defense
- Controlled by: France
- Condition: Occupied by Ministry of Defense

Location
- Coordinates: 48.84221°N 2.44208°E

Site history
- Built: 1841
- Battles/wars: Siege of Paris (1870–1871)

The Fort Neuf de Vincennes ("New Vincennes Fort") is a fortification built on the grounds of the Château de Vincennes, on the east side of Paris. While the old chateau had been a significant fortification in its time, by 1840 there was a need for a modern fort at that location, capable of using and defending itself against artillery fire. A new bastioned fort was built to the east of the historic chateau.

== Function ==
The fort remains the property of the Ministry of Defense, supporting a variety of Army activities. Public access is restricted. The fort houses the military archives of the Army, Navy and Air Force. The nearby chateau is a museum.

== History ==
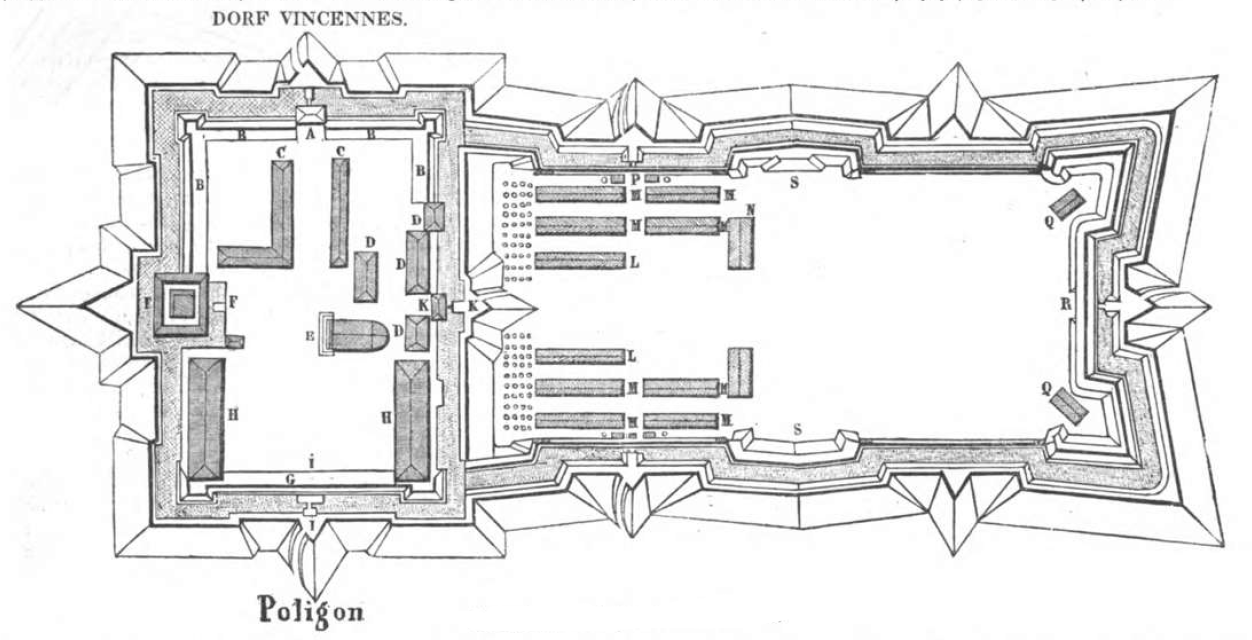
Plan of Fort Neuf

Built between 1841 and 1844, the Fort Neuf is one of seventeen forts built as part of the Thiers Wall fortifications for the defense of the capital. During the Siege of Paris (1870–1871) the fort was the headquarters for General Ribourt, in command of the area around Vincennes.

German spy Mata-Hari was executed at the fort on 15 October 1917.

The fort was the scene of the trials of Jean Bastien-Thiry and the other conspirators in the Petit-Clamart 1962 attempt on the life of President Charles de Gaulle, in which Bastien-Thiry was condemned to death by firing squad.

== See also ==
- Fortifications of Paris in the 19th and 20th centuries
