= Fort de l'Est =

- Part of Thiers fortifications of Paris
- Saint-Denis, France
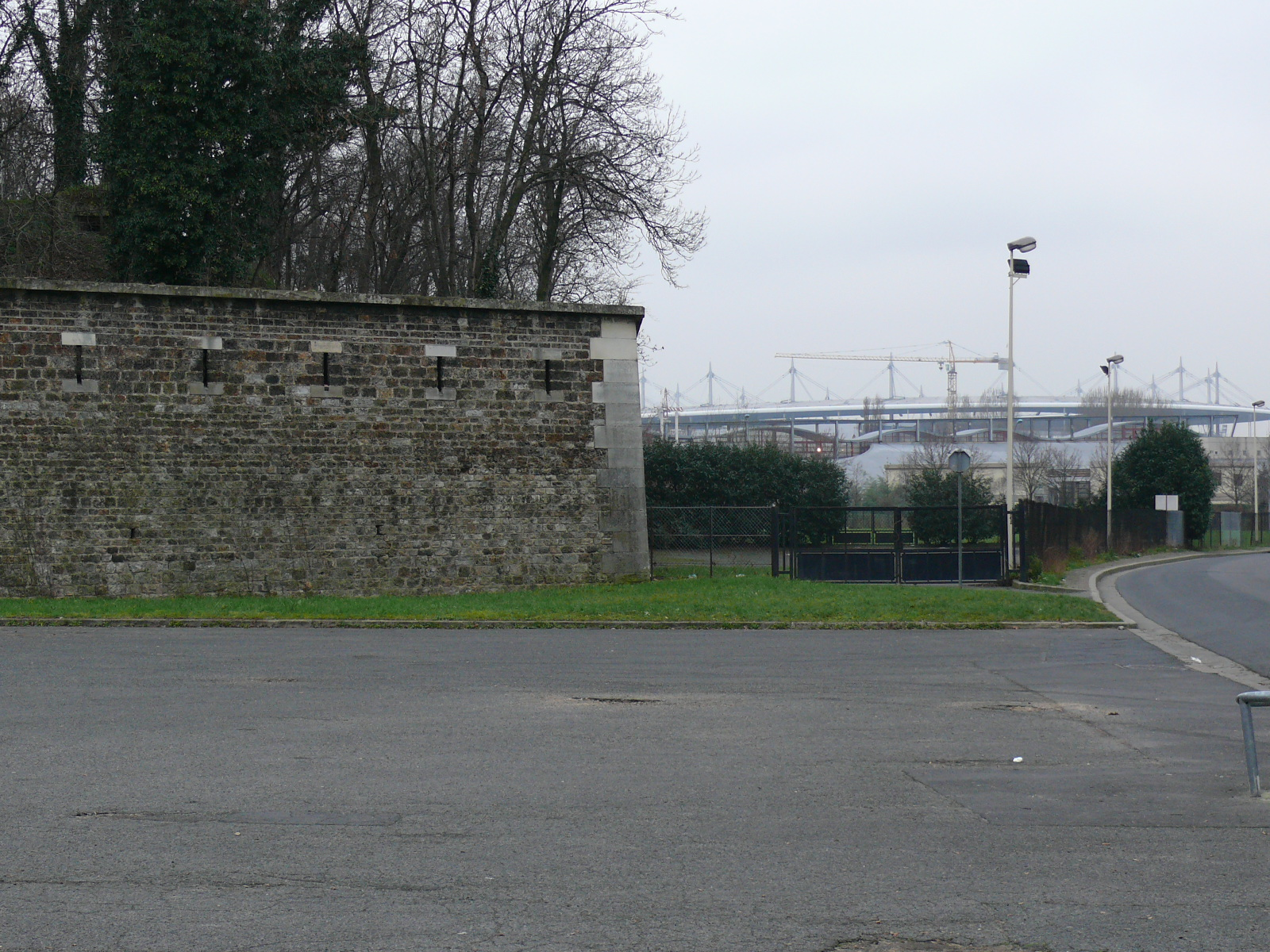
- Fort de l'Est in Saint-Denis and in the distance, Lycée Suger and the Stade de France

Site information
- Type: Fort
- Owner: French Army
- Controlled by: France
- Open to the public: no
- Condition: Occupied by French Army

Location
- Coordinates: 48.930556°N 2.372222°E

Site history
- Built: 1841
- Battles/wars: Siege of Paris (1870–1871)

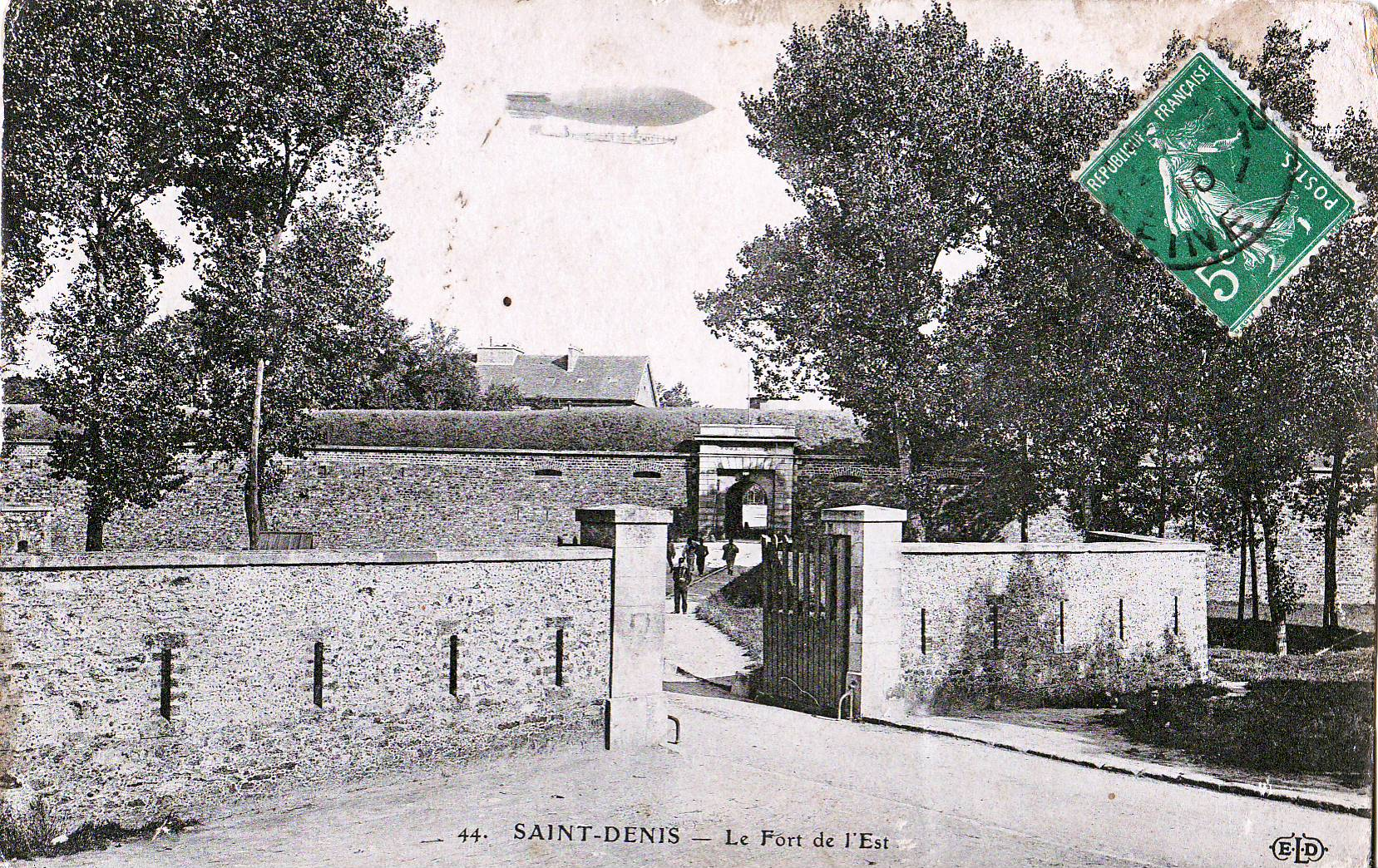
Fort de l'Est (1910) with dirigible apparently added to the image

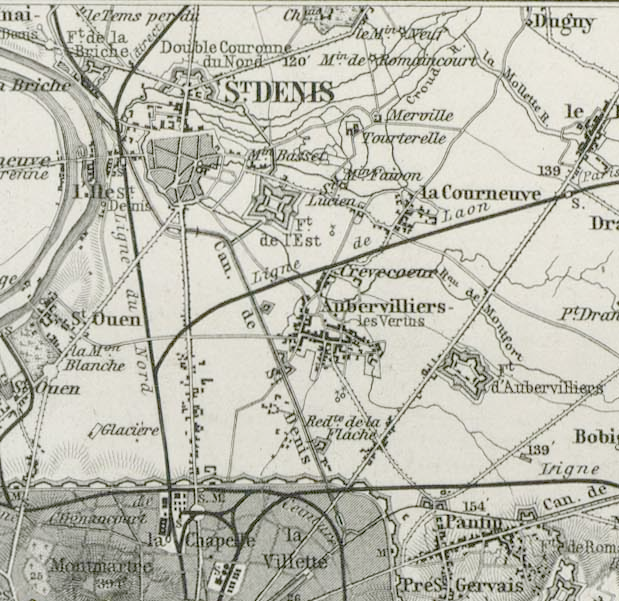
Map (1871) showing four forts: Saint-Denis: La Briche, Double-Couronne du Nord, Fort de l'Est and Fort d'Aubervilliers, along with the northern portion of the Thiers Wall

Fort de l'Est is a military strong point designed to protect Paris. It was built between 1841 and 1843 in Saint-Denis at the direction of French prime minister Adolphe Thiers, and was part of an immense defensive belt comprising 17 detached forts and the Thiers Wall surrounding Paris. The evolution of artillery quickly made these fortifications obsolete.

The fort is still used by the French Army. Units associated with the fort include a number of reserve units and the headquarters of the National Association of Reserve Warrant Officers. French Foreign Legion units associated with Operation Vigipirate are also stationed at Fort de l'Est. The northeast bastion of the formerly four-sided fort was removed to make way for the A1 autoroute, from which the fort is visible, and faces the Lycée Suger secondary school, built in 1994. The military files concerning military insubordinations of World War I in the French Army are preserved there, as well as some unclassified files from the library of the former garrison. The glacis of the fort is partly occupied by community gardens.

== Significant events ==
In 1870 the French forces at the Fort de l'Est fired on Stains, which was occupied by the Prussians, damaging a church and demolishing the chateau. Prussians eventually occupied the fort.

In 1872 the fort's chaplain, Jules Bonhomme, published a popular memoir featuring the fort.

On August 25, 1944, German army occupation forces evacuated the fort.

In 1958 the inter-army office for standardization of materials (BICM) was installed at Fort de l'Est after France's ratification in 1956 of NATO standardization policies.

During the Algerian War in 1962, a military tribunal held hearings at the Fort d l'Est in which Jean Bastien-Thiry was judged guilty of attempting to assassinate President Charles de Gaulle and condemned to death. He was executed at the Fort d'Ivry. Almost one hundred officers were held at Fort de l'Est.

Between 2002 and 2004 the Salvation Army operated a 150-bed winter shelter within the fort, assisting 18,000 persons in 2002.

In 2009 a village of temporary houses was placed on the site to accommodate about twenty Romani families moved from the "André-Campra" shantytown in La Plaine.

== Sources ==
- This page is a translation of its French equivalent.

== See also ==
- Fortifications of Paris in the 19th and 20th centuries
