= Fortifications of Paris in the 19th and 20th centuries =

List of forts in and around Paris, France

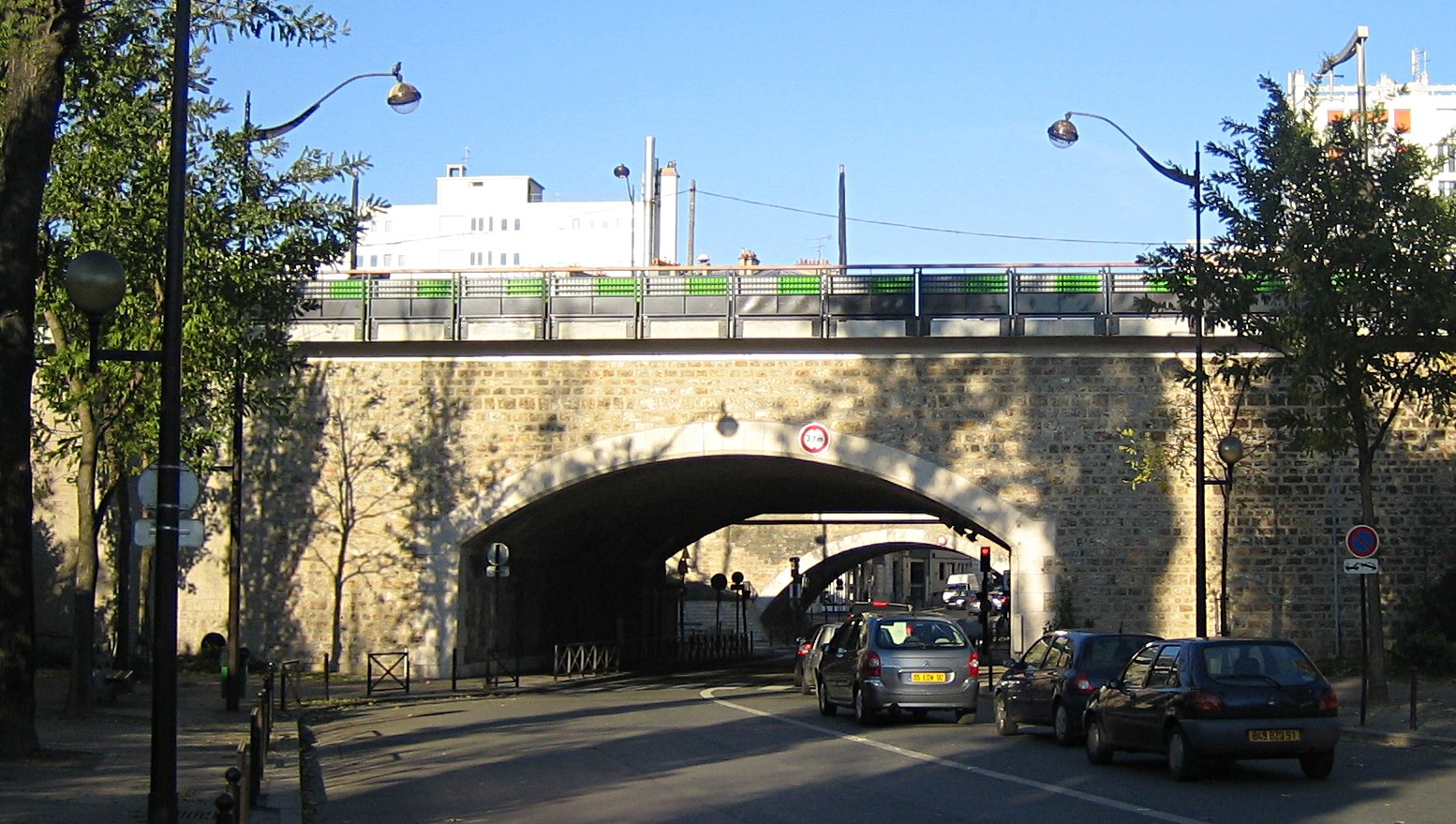
Vestige of the Thiers Wall (the poterne des Peupliers)

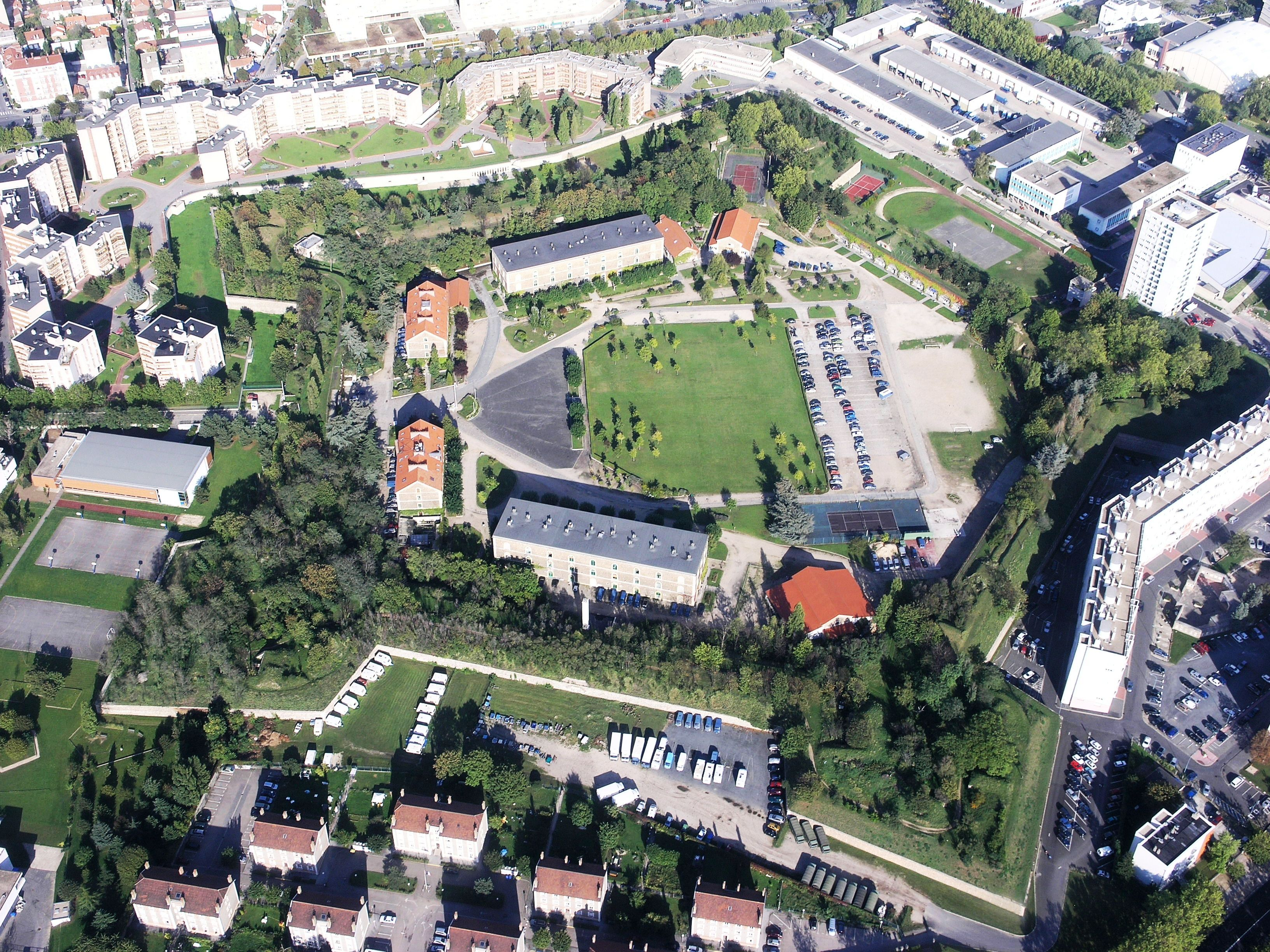
Fort de Charenton

The fortifications of Paris in the 19th and 20th centuries comprise:

- The Thiers Wall, surrounding the city of Paris, and farther from the city,
- The detached forts and their complementary fieldworks.

They were built in two stages:

- 1840–1845: the Thiers Wall and the first ring of forts, about five kilometers from the city;
- 1874–1885: the second ring of forts, about twenty kilometers from the city.

From a military point of view, Paris is a fortified camp situated in a basin. During the 19th century, both Prussian invasions (1814–15 and 1870) saw the bombardment of Paris from the surrounding heights. Fortifications were extended outwards after each invasion as the range of artillery continued to develop, in order to deny the use of the heights to the enemy.

== Chronology ==
=== Louis XIV ===
1670 The king demolishes the walls of Charles V and Louis XIII. Paris becomes an open city and remains so for two centuries.

1689 Vauban recommends the enclosure of Paris, with the construction of a second enclosure to include the then-villages of Chaillot, Montmartre and Belleville (located on heights overlooking the city), and two citadels flanking the city to the east and west to delay an enemy's approach.

=== Louis XVI ===
1784 The king orders the construction of the Farmers General Wall, built not as a fortification, but as a means of taxation.

=== Empire ===
1814–1815 Paris is occupied twice at the end of the reign of Napoleon I.

=== First fortification program ===
1818 Minister of War Laurent de Gouvion-Saint-Cyr creates a commission to "present its views on the best defense system" for Paris.

1820 The commission concludes that Paris must be placed in a state of defense, but proposes no specific project.

1830 Creation of a committee to study fortification which returns to the debate and again concludes that fortification is necessary, without consensus on how this is to be done.

1833 The defense plan for Paris envisages:

- The improvement of the Farmers General Wall (a tariff barrier) to a height of six meters, two ranges of crenelations and 65 towers or bastions;
- In advance of the Farmers General Wall, several delaying fortifications, along with a fortified line along the canal between Romainville and Saint-Denis, and a system of floodable areas around Saint-Denis;
- Ground works with casemates and star-shaped forts and redoubts on the heights between Saint-Denis and Nogent-sur-Marne; transformation of the Château de Vincennes into a modern fort. The works, carried out by General Éléonor-Zoa Dufriche de Valazé were often stopped and were not completed. In fact, two options worked in opposition:
- Option 1. A broad continuous enclosure that includes the suburbs in the defensive system, but not employing the Farmers General Wall. Valazé supports this scheme, a continuation of the plans of Vauban and François Nicolas Benoît, Baron Haxo.
- Option 2. The arrangement of the capital as a vast fortified camp, based on permanent forts occupying the principal positions while keeping a "containment shell" behind. Criticisms of this option relate to the insufficiency of the guarantee of defense: an enemy could easily penetrate between the obstacles, then engage the Farmers General fortifications.

1836 Creation of a commission on the defense of the kingdom.

1838 On July 16 a plan of defense is adopted, combining the two options in a show of unanimity.

1840 The Convention of London and Near Eastern crisis raises the prospect of an anti-French alliance, and Adolphe Thiers seizes the occasion to commence the construction of the new fortifications. On September 1 General Guillaume Dode de la Brunerie is named director of the fortification program. The appointment and work is publicly announced on September 13.

1841 Over the reservations of the General Council of the Seine, 140 million francs are appropriated for the work, allocated, including 17,970 million francs for land acquisition, 16,608 million francs for earthwork, and 83,356 million francs for masonry. The law authorizing work was promulgated by Louis-Philippe I on April 3, authorizing a continuous wall for both sides of the Seine, known as the Thiers Wall, supported by sixteen detached forts.

1845 Work is completed.

1860. The limits of the city of Paris are extended from the Farmers General Wall to the Thiers Wall, as part of the reorganization of the Paris urban fabric planned and executed by Georges-Eugène Haussmann.

=== Franco-Prussian War ===
July 1870 France declares war on Prussia, July 13.

September 1870 Napoleon III is captured at Sedan and capitulates. A republic is proclaimed and the Prussians move toward Paris. The capital is transformed into a fortified camp. A portion of the Thiers Wall gates are closed, along with canals and rail line entries. Houses are demolished in the designated "zone non ædificandi" to clear lines of fire. The Prussians arrive on 19 September and establish a siege, which will last four months.

January 1871 On the 28th the Treaty of Versailles is signed, stipulating that all of the forts forming the perimeter defense of Paris, together with their armaments, be handed over to the German forces. The treaty further stipulates the disarmament of the Thiers Wall.

March 1871 The German army abandons the forts on the left (south) bank of the Seine.

20 September 1871 The German army abandons the forts on the right (north) bank of the Seine.

=== Second program of fortification ===
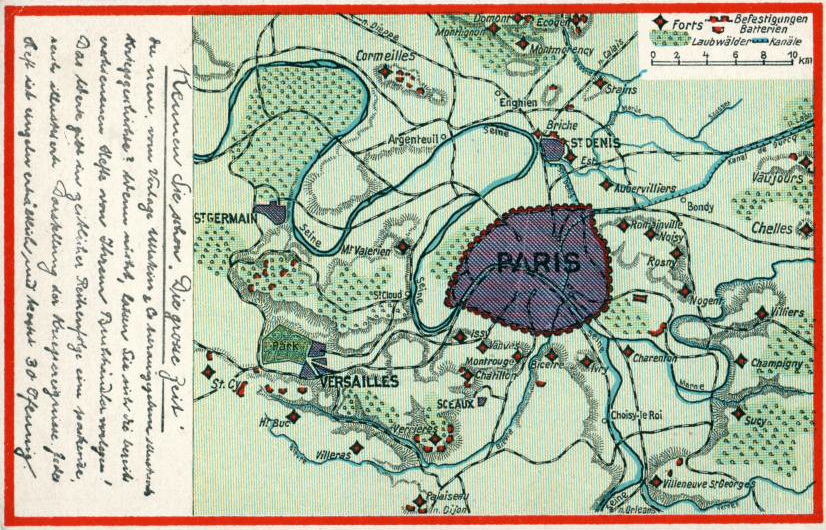
German post card prior to the 1914–1918 war, showing the defenses of Paris

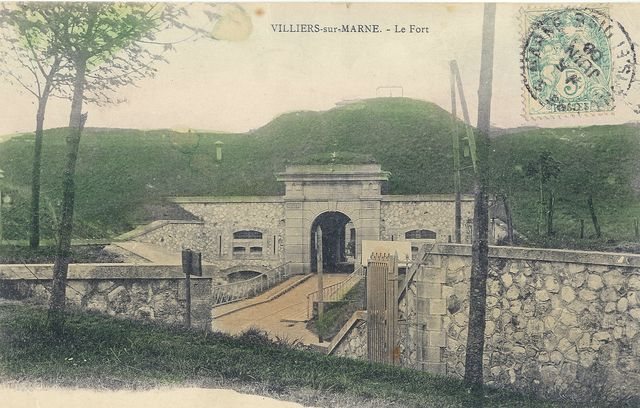
Fort de Villiers, 1878–1880, second ring of the Ile de France

During the 1870 war, the fortifications were relatively ineffective.

1874 On 17 July, a law inspired by the ideas of Séré de Rivières creates new programs for defensive works in the north and east of France, including some intended for the defense of Paris.

1885. The program is completed. 196 forts, 58 smaller works and 278 batteries are in place on the borders and at strategic points within France at an estimated cost of 450 million francs for the works and 229 million francs for their armament.

=== The removal of the Thiers Wall ===
1883 On June 11 the municipal council of Paris votes to request the removal of the Thiers Wall, the property's transfer to the city and the end of restrictions on building in its vicinity.

1918 During World War I the Thiers Wall proves to be ineffective in the defense of Paris, as the range of German artillery such as the Paris Gun (120 km) renders walls irrelevant.

1919 On 19 April the city purchases the property for 100 million francs from the State of France. The city must purchase or expropriate the associated grounds and must maintain the "zone non aedificandi." Work begins on the demolition of the walls.

1925–1930 The "territoire zonier" is annexed to the city.

1930 A law is enacted to regulate the methods for compensation of the "zoniers."

== The forts ==
=== Military doctrine for the employment of the forts ===
The doctrines for the use of the forts depend on the context of the time. During the 19th century the roads were few. Armies were obligated to move along existing lines of communication in order to maintain their provisioning without resorting to dirt roads in unfavorable seasons. Therefore, a fortification located on an important road would be able to slow or stop a large troop formation. For example the Fort de Charenton was placed to dominate Route nationale 6, the Paris-Geneva road, and Route nationale 19, the road to Belfort, as well as the fr:Pont de Charenton on the Marne and the Port à l'Anglais Bridge on the Seine.

In wartime, the fort would fulfill several functions, in the manner of a fortified town.

- The fort would provide a place of shelter for troops while passively resisting an assault by the enemy.
- If the enemy ignores the fort and circumvents it, they will be subject to attack from the rear by the fort's garrison, obliging a portion of the attacking forces to remain behind as protection.
- It is a point of concentration and protection for artillery
- It is a point of support for friendly forces

=== First ring of forts ===
The first ring of sixteen detached forts and complementary works, constituting the first line of defense a few kilometers from Paris, and supporting the Thiers Wall encircling Paris.

==== The sixteen forts ====
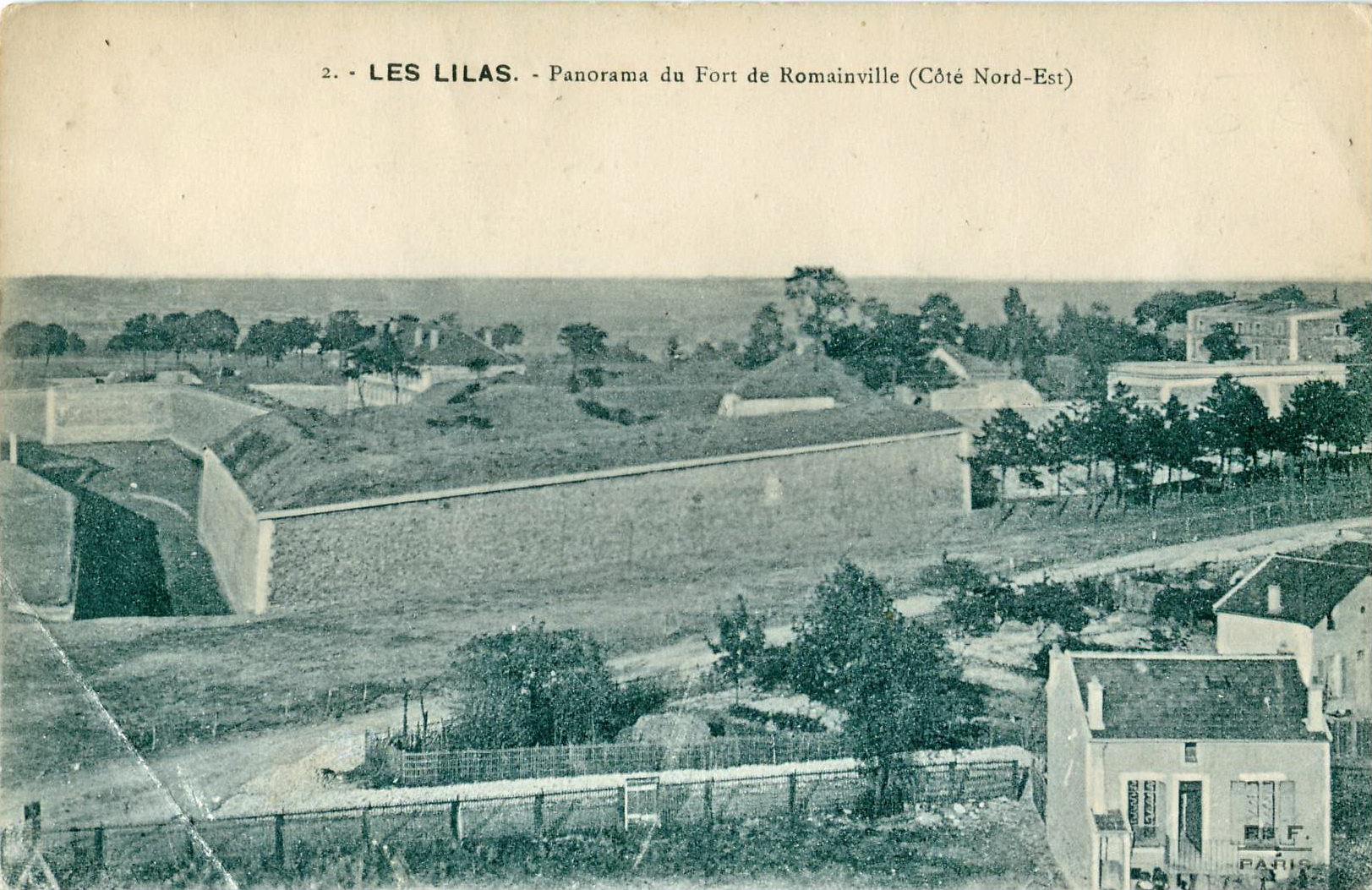
Panorama of the Fort de Romainville, at the beginning of the 20th century

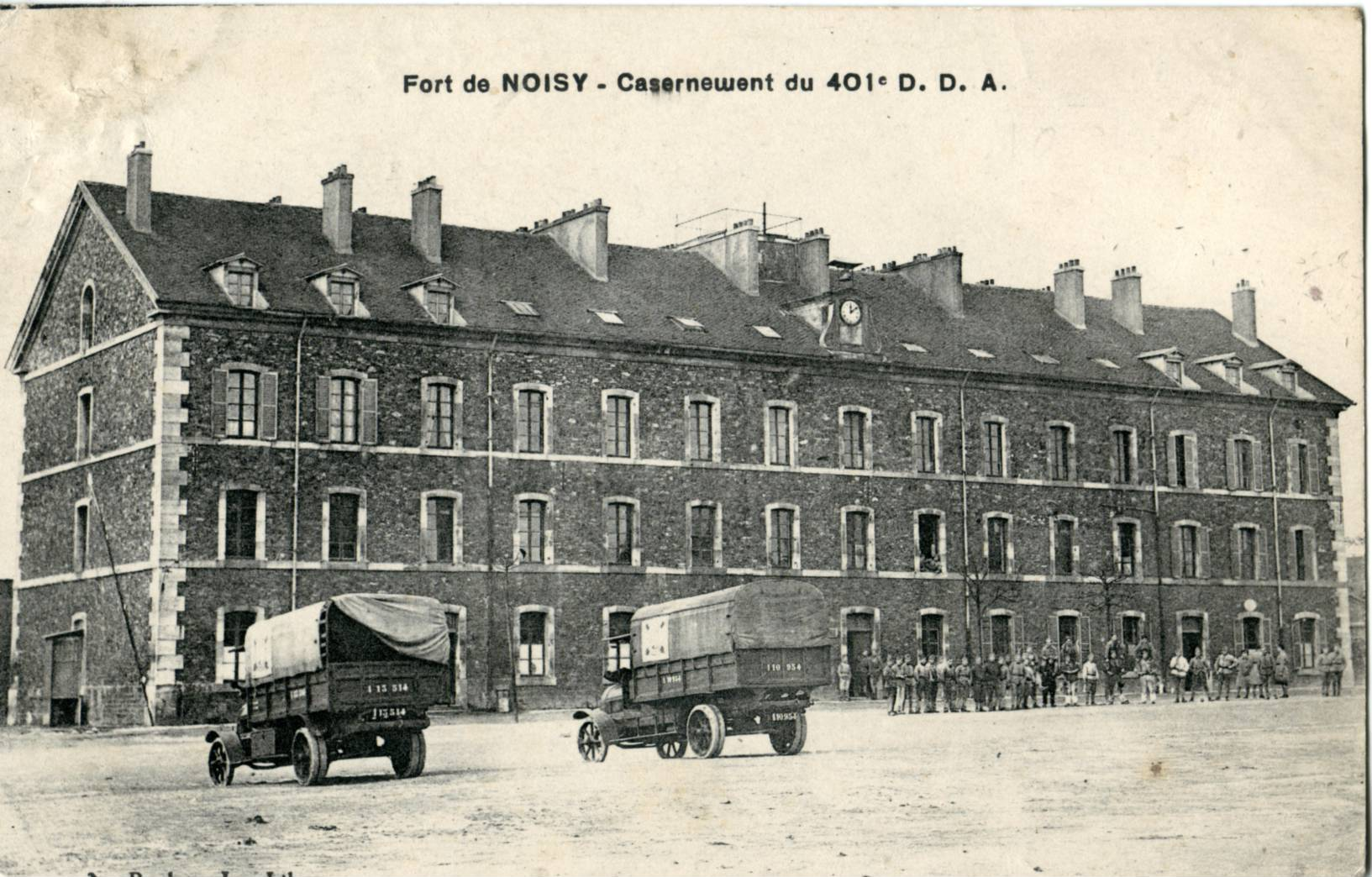
Fort de Noisy

The sixteen forts built around Paris between 1840 and 1845 are shown in the following table.

The order described in the first column describes the forts in order as they appear as one proceeds clockwise around Paris (north-east-south-west). Forts are named for the communities they defended, not necessarily those in which they are located.

Order	Dir.	Name	Emplacement	Distance from the Farmers General wall	Distance from the Louvre	Other works
1	N	Fort couronne de la Briche	Saint-Denis	6900 m	9600 m	
2	N	Fort de la Double-Couronne	Saint-Denis	6850 m	9600 m	
3	N/E	Fort de l'Est	Saint-Denis	5000 m	7900 m	
4	N/E	Fort d'Aubervilliers	Aubervilliers	3875 m	7250 m	Works and battery
5	E	Fort de Romainville	Les Lilas	3500 m	6650 m	Lunette + Courtine
6	E	Fort de Noisy	Romainville	4800 m	8300 m	Lunette + Redoubt
7	E	Fort de Rosny	Rosny-sous-Bois	5750 m	9800 m	Lunette
8	S/E	Fort de Nogent	Fontenay-sous-Bois	5900 m	10300 m	Lunette
9	S/E	Fort Neuf de Vincennes	Vincennes	2800 m	7800 m	
10	S/E	Fort de Charenton	Maisons-Alfort	4000 m	8400 m	Rigole
11	S	Fort d'Ivry	Ivry-sur-Seine	3900 m	7300 m	
12	S	Fort de Bicêtre	Le Kremlin-Bicêtre	2650 m	6100 m	
13	S	Fort de Montrouge	Arcueil	2900 m	5800 m	
14	S	Fort de Vanves	Malakoff	3600 m	6400 m	
15	S	Fort d'Issy	Issy	3900 m	6850 m	
16	W	Fort Mont-Valérien	Suresnes	5250 m	9100 m	

==== Complementary works ====
Order	Dir.	Name	Emplacement	Date
1		Digue du Croult	Saint-Denis	
2		Digue du ru de Montfort,	Saint-Denis	
3		Batterie des Vertus	Aubervilliers	
4		Redoute de la Flache	Aubervilliers	
5		Batterie de Pantin	Pantin	
6		Redoute de Montreuil		
7		Redoute de la Boissière	Rosny-sous-Bois	1831
8		Redoute de Fontenay-sous-Bois	Fontenay-sous-Bois	
9		Redoute de Gravelle	Paris (bois de Vincennes)	
10		Redoute de la Faisanderie		
11		Batterie du Rouvray		

=== Second ring of forts ===
This section includes those works completed between 1870 and 1890 as part of the Séré de Rivières fortifications, in the region of 20 kilometers from the capital.

	Dir.	Name	Emplacement	Date
1	N	Fort de Cormeilles-en-Parisis	Cormeilles-en-Parisis	
2	N	Fort de Montlignon	Montlignon	
3	N	Fort de Domont	Domont	
4	N	Fort de Montmorency	Montmorency	
5	N	Fort d'Écouen	Écouen	
6	N	Redoute de la Butte-Pinson	Montmagny	1875–1877
7	N	Fort de Stains	Garges-les-Gonesse	
8	E	Fort de Vaujours	Courtry	
9	E	Fort de Chelles	Chelles	
10	E	Fort de Villiers	Noisy-le-Grand	1878
11	E	Fort de Champigny	Champigny-sur-Marne	
12	E	Fort de Sucy	Sucy-en-Brie	
13	E	Fort de Villeneuve	Villeneuve-Saint-Georges	1876
14	S/W	Fort de Palaiseau	Palaiseau	
15	S/W	Fort de Châtillon	Châtillon-sous-Bagneux; Fontenay-aux-Roses	
16	S/W	Fort de Villeras	Saclay	
17	S/W	Batterie de Bouviers	Guyancourt	1879
18	S/W	Batterie du Ravin de Bouviers	Versailles	
19	S/W	Fort du Haut-Buc	Buc (Yvelines)	1879
20	S/W	Fort de Saint-Cyr	Montigny-le-Bretonneux	1879
21	S/W	Fort du Trou-d'Enfer	Marly-le-Roi	1881
22	S/W	Fort de Bois-d'Arcy	Bois d'Arcy	

== Sources ==
- This page is a translation of its French equivalent.

== See also ==
- City walls of Paris
- Siege of Paris (1870–1871)
- City gates of Paris

== Bibliography ==
- Félix et Louis Lazare, Dictionnaire historique des rues et monuments de Paris en 1855; rééd. par Maisonneuve et Laroze, 1993, p. 132.
- Renaud Gagneux et Denis Prouvost, Sur les traces des enceintes de Paris, Parigramme, 2004.
- Jacques Hillairet, Dictionnaire historique des rues de Paris
- Guy le Hallé, Histoire des fortifications de Paris et leur extension en Île-de-France, Éditions Horvath, 1995.
- Guy le Hallé, « Sur les traces de l'enceinte du prieuré Saint-Martin-des-Champs », « La Ballade des Fortifs », in Paris aux cent villages, numbers 34 to 45.
