= Fort de Sucy =

Historical fort around Paris

Coordinates: 48°46′7″N 2°31′54″E

- Part of Fortifications of Paris, Séré de Rivières system
- Sucy-en-Brie, France
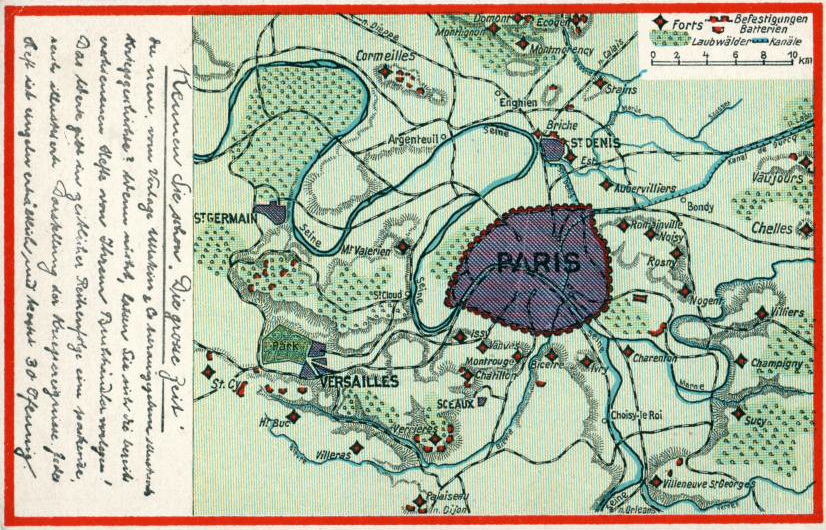
- German post card showing the fortifications of Paris

Site information
- Type: Fort
- Owner: Sucy-en-Brie
- Controlled by: France
- Open to the public: yes
- Condition: Under restoration

Location

Site history
- Built: 1879
- Battles/wars: Siege of Paris

Fort de Sucy was built following the Franco-Prussian War to defend Paris. Located to the southeast of Paris in Sucy-en-Brie, the fort was part of an outer ring of eighteen major fortifications built in response to improvements in the range and effectiveness of artillery since the construction of the Thiers fortifications of the 1840s. It was built in accordance with improved principles of fortification developed for the Séré de Rivières system.

The Fort de Sucy was built between 1879 and 1881 on a location that had been used by the Prussians to bombard the Saint-Maur peninsula in the 1870 war. The site controlled movement on the Route nationale 4 (Paris-Strasbourg) and Route nationale 19 (Paris-Mulhouse). The site also overlooked the Bois Notre-Dame and the Armainvillers Forest. With the advent of improved explosive shells, the fort was modernized with concrete cover almost immediately after it was completed.

The roughly rectangular fort has an indented front with the main entrance at the centre, flanked by caponiers in a nine-metre-wide ditch. A central magazine in the barracks could hold 67 tons of gunpowder. The barracks accommodated 372 men, ten officers, and a tank.

Modernization was foreseen in 1911, with additional fortifications in concrete, including three shelters and two observation turrets with machine guns. This project was never realized due to a lack of credits. In 1914 the fort contained fourteen guns on the rampart and ten on the caponiers. By 1915 two 75mm anti-aircraft guns were installed.

Additional armament was installed in 1935 (Four 105mm Anti Aircraft guns), but the fort saw little action during World War II. The barracks, used as munitions storage, was destroyed on 22 August 1944 by the German army before it left the fort.

The abandoned Fort de Sucy was purchased by Sucy-en-Brie in 1970. It has been under restoration since 1996 by an association "A La Découverte du Fort de Sucy"

== See also ==
- Fortifications of Paris in the 19th and 20th centuries
