= Fort de Bicêtre =

- Part of Thiers fortifications of Paris
- Kremlin-Bicêtre, France
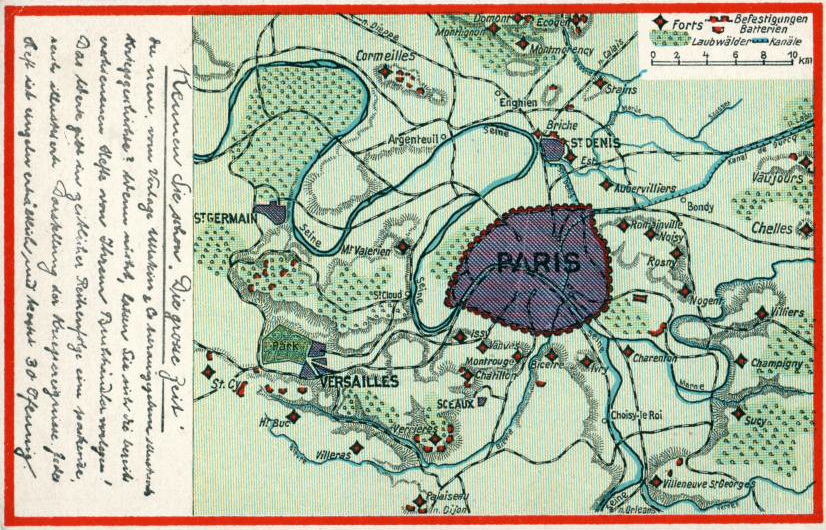
- German post card showing the fortifications of Paris including Fort de Bicêtre

Site information
- Type: Fort
- Owner: Ministry of Defense
- Controlled by: France
- Condition: Occupied by Ministry of Defense

Location
- Coordinates: 48.80558°N 2.35498°E

Site history
- Built: 1841
- Battles/wars: Siege of Paris (1870–1871)

The Fort de Bicêtre is a military structure built between 1841 and 1845 during the reign of Louis-Philippe during a time of tension between France and England, in the Paris suburb of Kremlin-Bicêtre. The fort is part of the Thiers Wall fortifications of Paris, built under a program of defensive works initiated by Adolphe Thiers. The fort served as a prison for those involved in the French coup of 1851.

Occupied by the Prussians in 1871, the fort was briefly occupied by communards during the Paris Commune. After 1874, under the direction of General Raymond Adolphe Séré de Rivières, the ring of Thiers fortifications was reinforced by a second ring of forts, reflecting the increased range of artillery during the intervening years. The Fort de Bicêtre was not modernized at this time, since it was considered too close to Paris to be useful.

From 1940 to 1944 the fort was occupied by German troops. After World War II the fort remained a military post, successively accommodating an artillery unit, a Marine infantry battalion, and from 1946 a military radio facility.

== Description ==
In the 1840s, prime minister Adolphe Thiers proposed that Paris be transformed into a fortified city. The Thiers plan envisioned a wall around the city, reinforced by a ring of forts in the city's suburbs. Built between 1841 and 1845, the Fort de Bicêtre was one of seventeen bastioned forts.

The forts were sited in advance of the city walls to keep an enemy out of artillery range of the capital. As a result of shortages of money, manpower and materièl, some of the forts' armament and personnel were drawn from the Navy.

The Fort de Bicêtre was initially commanded by naval Capitaine de Frégate Fournier, with an armament of 86 artillery pieces. Like many locations around Paris, the ground under the fort had been tunneled and quarried for stone. These quarries were sealed or fortified. Like all of the detached forts, the Fort de Bicêtre was composed of an enclosing masonry wall with battlements and interior earth embankments, and was surrounded by a cleared glacis. With an area of 25 hectares (62 acres), the fort is pentagonal in shape, enclosed by a wall, ditch and counterscarp.

=== Entry and drawbridge ===
The fort is entered by a large gate with flanking guardhouses. A counterweighted Poncelet drawbridge originally spanned the ditch.

=== Magazines ===
The magazines, located in the bastions flanking the entrance and on the fort's surface amount to 142 square metres (1,530 sq ft) in area, holding fifty tons of black powder. The rectangular magazines are constructed of stone with wall thicknesses of over two meters, with a blast wall at the main door to limit damage in the event of an explosion. The interior of the magazines has two levels, with wooden floors, fastened with wood pegs or bronze nails to avoid inadvertent sparks. The top of the magazine was protected by a lightning conductor.

=== Officers' quarters and barracks ===
The officers' quarters are joined with the troop barracks along the place d'armes. In 1859-60 a separate infirmary was constructed to free space for married officers. The barracks was a four-story building, accommodating about seven hundred men. The roof was a terrace, less prone to fire than a roof, and offering a firing platform under combat. The ground floor housed the mess halls and non-commissioned officers' quarters. A separate kitchen was later built to expand the barracks. Only one well remains of the barracks, which have been replaced by more modern buildings.

=== Casemates ===
The Fort de Bicêtre features thirty casemates in two groups of fifteen, one located between bastions 2 and 3, and the other between 3 and 4. The casemates measure 20 metres (66 ft) by 6 metres (20 ft), on a vaulted platform covered with earth. Three mortars for close defense were located on the south side. Each casemate protected a thirty-eight-man gun crew.

At present, the casemates have been renovated as office space.

=== Latrines ===
Located behind the barracks and officers' quarters, the latrines were served by an aqueduct system.

== History ==
=== Construction to the Second World War ===
In 1851 the Fort de Bicêtre was a prison for plotters in a coup d'état against Napoleon III. Several casemates were transformed into jails to hold prisoners before execution or deportation. During the Franco-Prussian War, the Fort de Bicêtre and the other southern Paris forts were shelled by the Prussians. In early 1871 the French government capitulated and the Prussians occupied the fortifications of Paris. Bicêtre was occupied by the Prussian 6th Corps from 29 January to 20 March 1871. As the Prussians began to withdraw in March, the Paris Commune uprising took place, occupying several southern forts including Bicêtre. After bloody attacks by French government forces, the communards left the fort during the night of 24–25 May.

In 1914 the fort was again manned by naval personnel.

During the Second World War, the Germans occupied the fort, a strategic point on the road to Fontainebleau. The Germans built three concrete blockhouses, a subterranean hospital and a water reservoir. The hospital totaled 80 square metres (860 sq ft) in area under 2 metres (6.6 ft) of earth and 1-metre (3.3 ft) of concrete. The facility also sheltered a command port. The reservoir was used in the 1960s as a swimming pool.

=== After the Second World War ===
From 1946, the fort was transformed into a military radio communications facility manned by the 1st Battalion of the 8th Transmissions Regiment. From 1949 the Munitions Service (ERGM) moved to Bicêtre from Versailles and the Etablissement Régional du Matériel des Transmissions was moved there from 1967. From 1968 the Etablissement annexe du Matériel des Transmissions (EAMT) became the Centre Spécialisé des Transmissions Nord (CST Nord). In 1979 the fort acquired the Direction des Transmissions d’Infrastructure/Administration Centrale DTI/AC). In 1983 the Centre de Contrôle des Fréquences (CCF/Nord) moved to Bicêtre from Mont Valérien. In 1991 the Centre National de Soutien des Transmissions arrived at the fort, becoming the Centre de Soutien Spécialisé des Transmissions 2 (CSST2). In 1992 the Direction Centrale des Transmissions (DCT/DCTSI/DCTEI) arrived. In 1994 CSST2 amalgamated with CSST1 in Suresnes and CSST3 in Toulouse to become the Centre National de Soutien Spécialisé des Transmissions (CNSST). In 1996 the Centre d’Études et de Réalisation des Systèmes d’Information de l’Armée de Terre, Bureau Architecture Études (CERSIAT/BAE) was created to manage Army information technology. In 1997 the Système d’Information des Formations de l’Armée de Terre (SIFAT) appeared.

From July 2003 the units were reorganized into the Direction interarmées des réseaux d'infrastructure et des systèmes d'information (DIRISI) under the Ministry of Defense.

== Public access ==
Since it is still used by the Ministry of Defense, the fort is closed to the public. However, tours are organized for European Heritage Days in September.

== See also ==
- Fortifications of Paris in the 19th and 20th centuries

== Bibliography ==
- Histoire du Kremlin-Bicêtre: l'identité d'une ville, Ville du Kremlin-Bicêtre (1997) ISBN 2-9510648-0-2
- Des fortifs au périf – J.-L. Cohen et A. Lortie (1992)
