= Fort de Vaujours =

Fort and research center in Vaujours, France

- Part of Fortifications of Paris, Séré de Rivières system
- Courtry, France
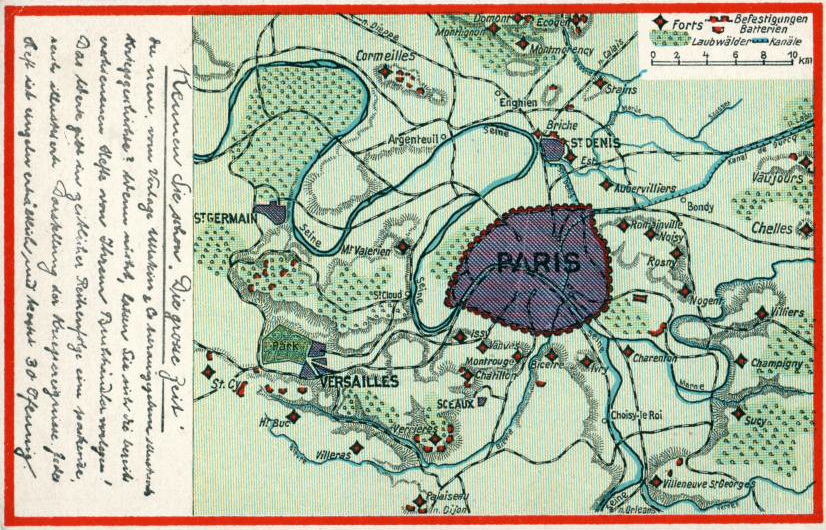
- German World War I postcard, showing the defenses of Paris

Site information
- Type: Fort
- Owner: French Atomic Energy Commission (closed)
- Controlled by: France
- Open to the public: No

Location
- Coordinates: 48.92555°N 2.59819°E

Site history
- Built: 1876
- Materials: Masonry, concrete

The Fort de Vaujours, located in the commune of Courtry, Seine-Saint-Denis, near the town of Vaujours, is one of the forts built at the end of the 19th century to defend Paris. After 1955, it was an atomic energy research center for France's Commission for Atomic Energy (CEA). The center was closed in 1997.

== History ==
In 1870, France was partly occupied by the Prussian army. As a result of this defeat, the Séré de Rivières system of fortifications was built from 1874–1881 to defend Paris, consisting of 18 forts, five redoubts and 34 batteries.

Construction started in 1876 on a roughly pentagonal fort with 48 artillery pieces and a garrison of 691 troops. Work was completed in 1882. The fort was updated in 1911 with a machine gun turret and a Mougin turret with two 155 mm guns. The Fort de Vaujours is unique in its association with two annexes connected by a covered way to the main fort.

The fort's barracks were burned in 1944. In 1947 the Sevran explosives works used the facility. From 1955, the site was occupied by the CEA as a research center, which considerably modified the fort and its environs. The CEA conducted pyrotechnic experiments at the location, using shock tubes and similar apparatus to study high-pressure shock waves in uranium. The Vaujours facility closed in 1997. The CEA proposed to sell the property, but concerns about radioactive contamination have stalled the sale.

The large trapezoidal fort's main armament was a twin 155 mm Mougin turret. The turret remains, but its guns have been removed.

== Annexes ==
Fort de Vaujours' artillery battery annexes are located to the north and south of the main fort, connected by covered ways. The northern battery was manned by 162 troops with six gun mounts in casemates. The fort formed a rectangle, surrounded by a ditch which lacked the caponiers of the main fort for its defense. The south annex also has six gun emplacements. The north battery is being demolished while the south battery is in very good state and occupied by an association.

== See also ==
- Fortifications of Paris in the 19th and 20th centuries
