= Fort de Champigny =

- Part of Fortifications of Paris, Séré de Rivières system
- Chennevières-sur-Marne, France
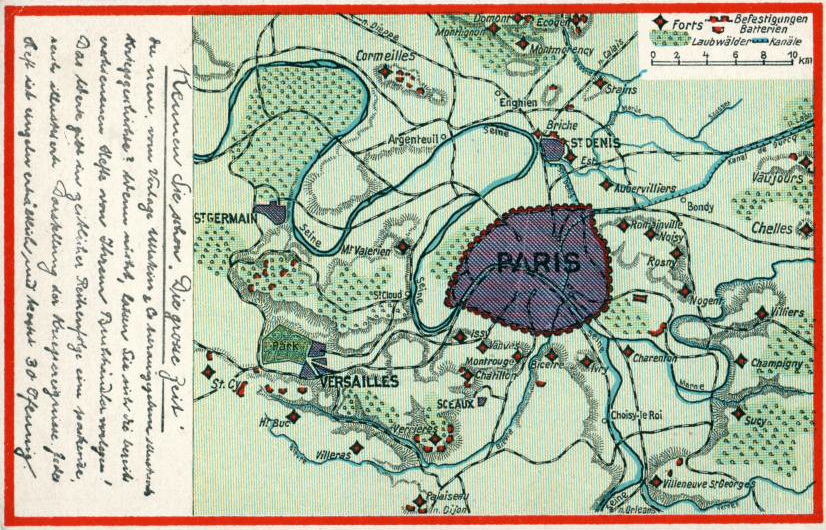
- German post card showing the fortifications of Paris

Site information
- Type: Fort
- Owner: Chennevières-sur-Marne
- Controlled by: France
- Condition: Under restoration

Location
- Coordinates: 48.803611°N 2.533889°E

Site history
- Built: 1878
- Battles/wars: Siege of Paris

Fort de Champigny was built following the Franco-Prussian War to defend Paris. Located to the southeast of Paris in Chennevières-sur-Marne, the fort was part of an outer ring of fortifications built in response to improvements in the range and effectiveness of artillery since the construction of the Thiers fortifications of the 1840s. It was built in accordance with improved principles of fortification developed for the Séré de Rivières system.

The Fort de Champigny was built between 1878 and 1880 on an area of eight hectares at a location that had been used by the Prussians to bombard Paris in the 1870 war. The site controlled movement on the Paris-Troyes railway line at Champigny-sur-Marne. The four-sided fort is surrounded by a ditch and a counterscarp. The fort encloses a paved court surrounded by quarters for 388 men. Water was supplied by cisterns. The fort was initially armed with 34 guns.

The fort was modernized in 1911, with additional fortifications in concrete, including two observation turrets in the fort's caponiers with machine guns. In 1914 the fort contained no more than ten guns on the rampart and ten on the caponiers. During the First World War the fort fired on the Plateau d'Avron with ten guns of 12 and 15 cm caliber. In 1939 and 1940 the fort was used for anti-aircraft artillery. The fort's caserne was burned in July 1944.

The Fort de Champigny was taken out of military service in 1965. It was placed on the Supplemental Inventory of the Monuments Historiques in 1979. It has been under restoration since 1984, and is to serve as a youth center.

== See also ==
- Fortifications of Paris in the 19th and 20th centuries
