= Batterie de Bouviers =

- Part of Fortifications of Paris, Séré de Rivières system
- Guyancourt, France
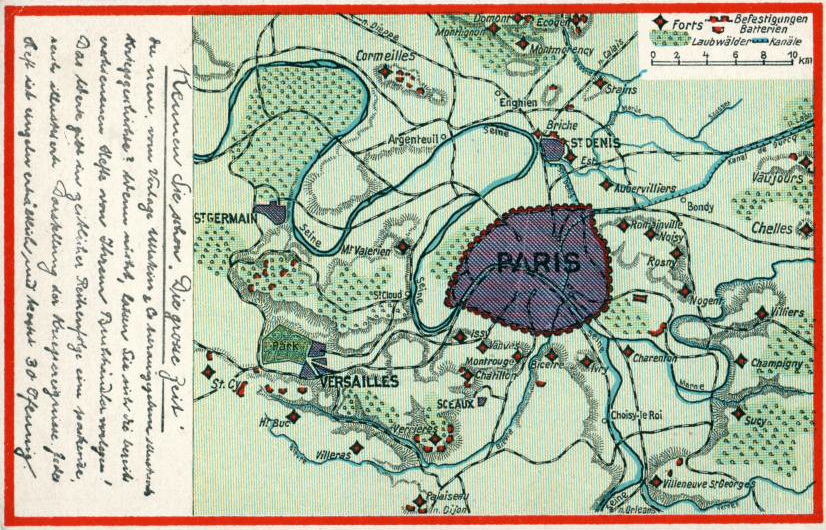
- German postcard depicting the fortifications of Paris

Site information
- Type: Fort
- Owner: Saint-Quentin-en-Yvelines
- Controlled by: France
- Open to the public: Yes
- Condition: Partially restored and reused

Location
- Location within Île-de-France (region)
- Coordinates: 48.783584°N 2.059764°E

Site history
- Built: 1874
- Battles/wars: World War II

The Batterie de Bouviers (French pronunciation: [batʁi də buvje]) is located in the commune of Guyancourt, Yvelines, France. It is a former fortification built beginning in 1879 and occupied by the army until 1932. From 1933 it was leased by the Hispano Suiza company as a factory, surrounded by other industrial structures. The site was abandoned by Hispano Suiza in 1990, and was sold by the Ministry of Defense in 1999. In 2006 the battery became the "Cafe Musiques", surrounded by office buildings and a music school.

== History ==
In 1870 France was partly occupied by the Prussian army. Following that defeat, France instituted the Séré de Rivières system of fortifications, with a new outer ring of fortifications to defend Paris from long-range artillery bombardment. 18 forts, five redoubts and 34 batteries were built between 1874 and 1881.

The Batterie de Bouviers was built between 1877 and 1879 as part of this project, near the village of Bouviers in the town of Guyancourt. Since the battery was built the town has expanded with the construction of the Saules neighborhood in the vicinity of the battery.

The Batterie de Bouviers was part of an ensemble comprising two forts, the Fort de Villeras in Saclay and the Fort du Haut-Buc, with five peripheral works: the Batterie de la Port du Désert (destroyed), the Batterie de la station de St-Cyr (partly destroyed), the Batterie du Ravin de Bouviers, the Ouvrage des Docks and the Batteries de Bouviers.

The Batterie du Ravin de Bouviers is of modest dimensions, and is therefore sometimes termed a redoubt. The similarity between the Battery/Redoubt du Ravin de Bouviers and the Batterie de Bouviers has given rise to confusion between the two positions.

The strategy for siting the various fortified positions was one of mutual support between fortifications, with converging fields of fire on enemy troops attempting to pass between fortifications. When conceived in the 1870s the fortifications were considered impregnable. However, the introduction of high-explosive shells capable of penetrating masonry made these positions obsolete almost as soon as they were completed.

== Description ==
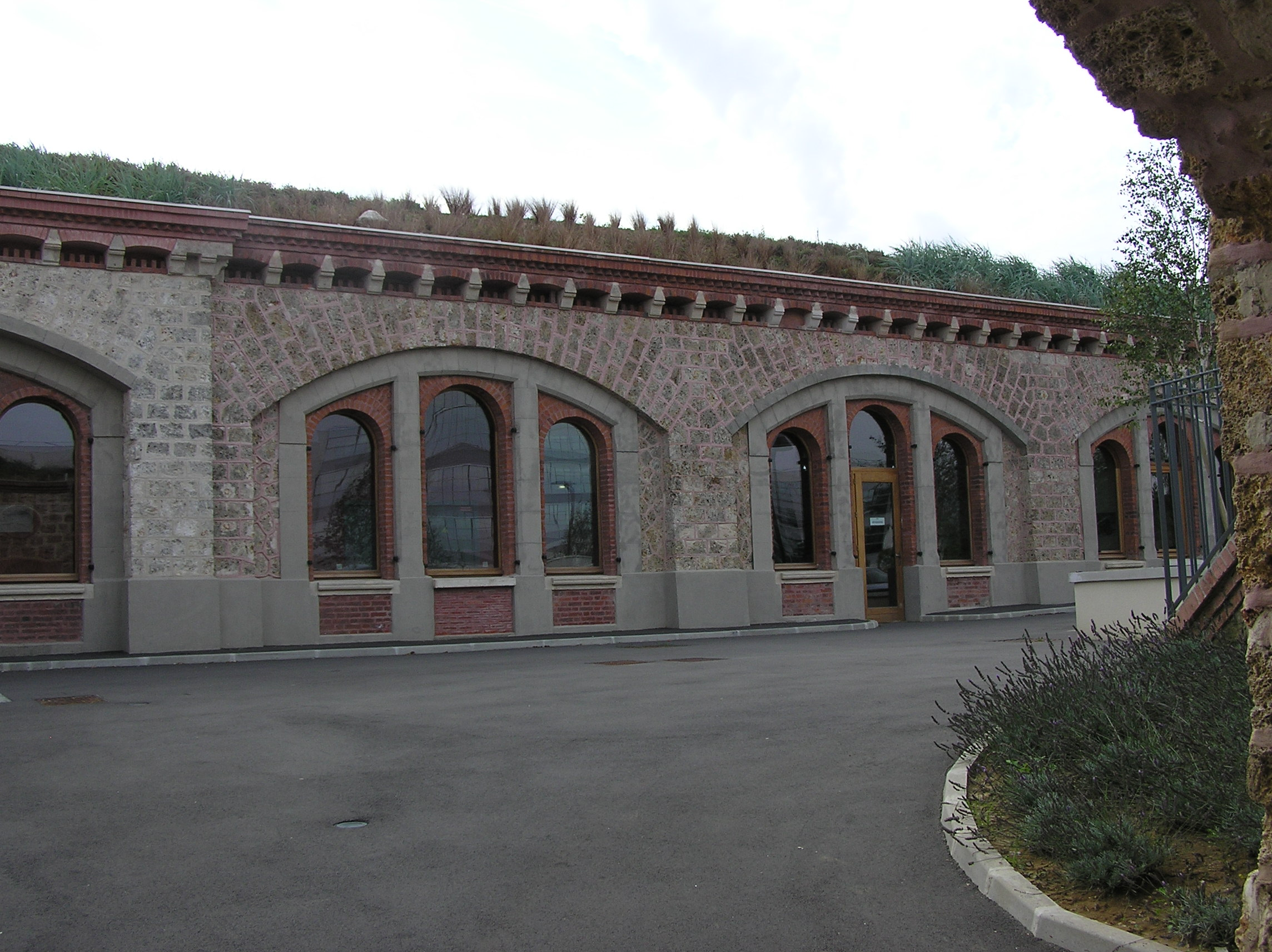
Entry to the casemates

The principal battery, known as the caserne sous le parados (barracks under the entrance) is composed of gun chambers all oriented opening on the northeastern facade, with arched vaults expressed on the main wall as blind arches. Materials include limestone, millstone and brick. Concrete was added after 1879, and was retained in the 2006 renovation. A small bastion protects the entry from direct fire directly opposite the gate.

== The military battery ==
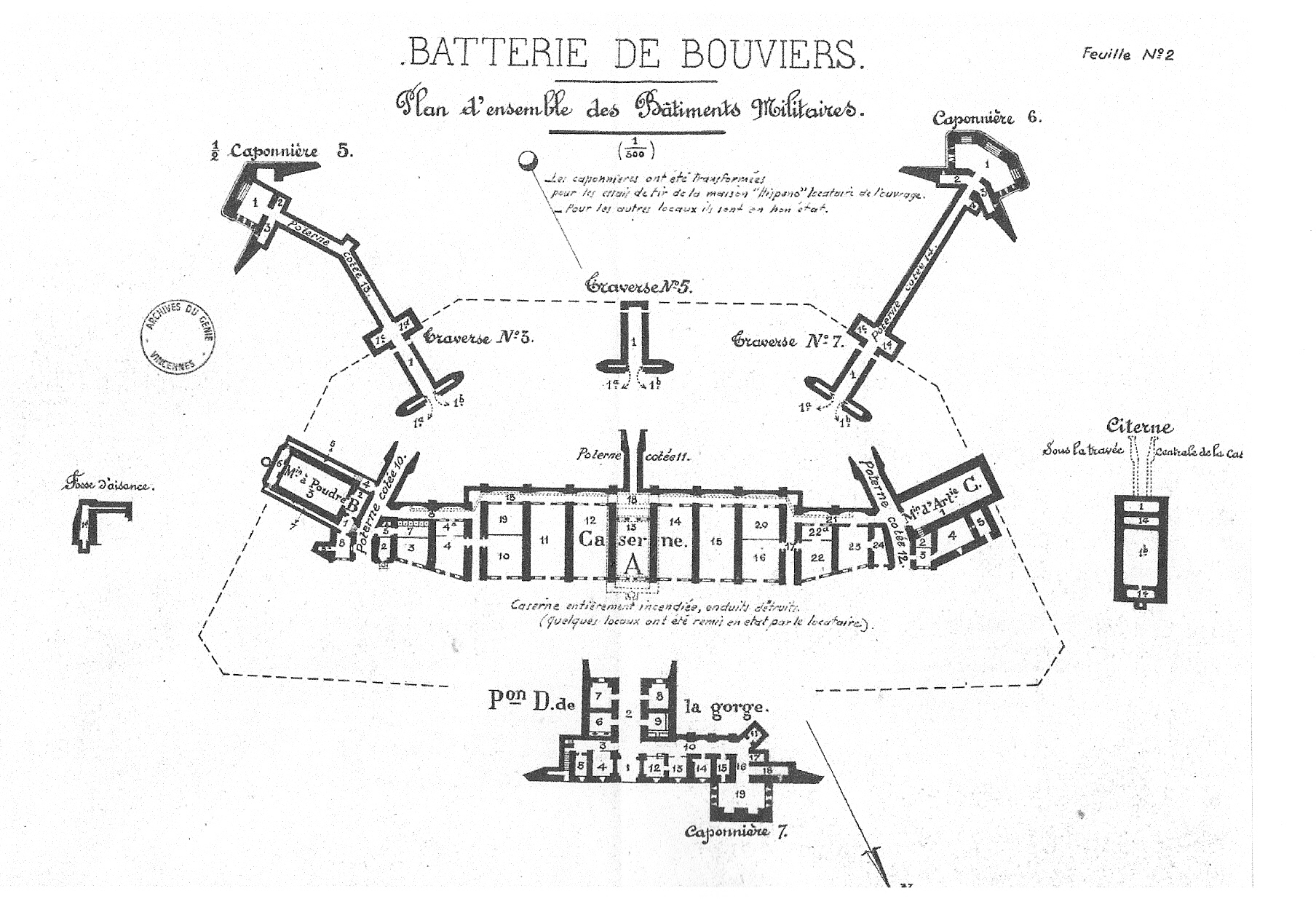
Plan of the Batterie de Bouviers

The central portion of the battery is composed of rectangular units measuring 6 metres (20 ft) by 15 feet (4.6 m), vaulted, and separated from each other by sidewalls 1.5 metres (4.9 ft) in depth, housing the casemates. Individual vaults are structurally independent of the others, preventing damage to one from affecting the others. The casemates are covered by soil up to 5 feet (1.5 m) thick in a trapezoidal mass, using material excavated from the battery's dry moat, which surrounds the position. The barracks are served by a corridor to the rear. Doors and windows were fitted with armored shutters, providing protection against shrapnel. Fittings for the shutters remain in place. Two caponiers covered the front of the battery on the far side of the ditch, and another covered the ditch to the rear. The ditch and caponiers have been destroyed, along with the powder magazines.

The gate is crowned with the inscription "Batterie de Bouviers" and "1879," with a relief of a mortar on the keystone. Rainwater was collected by gutters and channeled to cisterns under the battery, supporting at least 200 troops and 19 artillery pieces.

After the introduction of high explosive artillery shells, the fortifications became obsolete. The forts closest to the frontiers were modified, but the fortifications of Paris received little improvement due to financial restrictions.

== Hispano Suiza ==
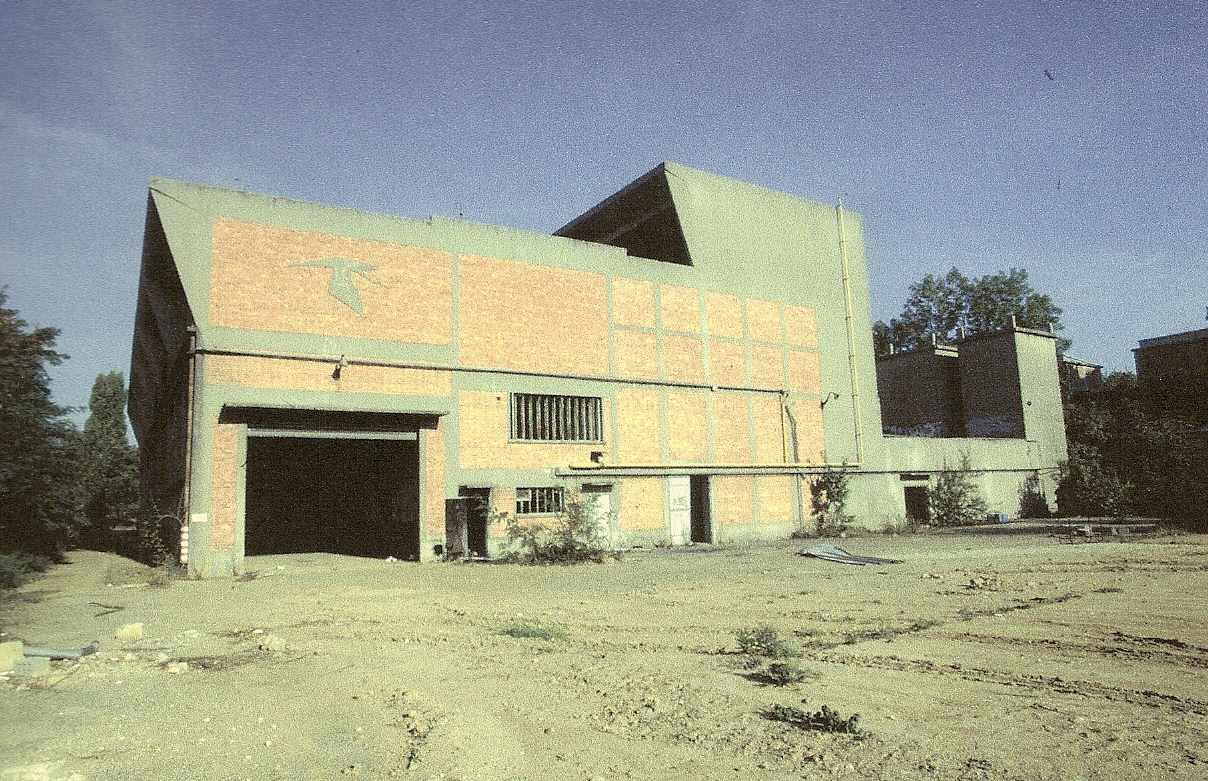
Hispano Suiza building in 2000

The battery was occupied by the military until 1932. From 1933 the battery was leased to Hispano Suiza who surrounded it with numerous industrial buildings, where the company made munitions. This caused friction with the local populace, which was until this time predominantly agricultural. Daily test firing caused further concern. At the beginning of World War II, the battery was bombarded and munitions production was relocated to the Charente. After the war work was confined to work on motors and turbines. The factory was closed in 1990 and sold by the Ministry of Defense in 1999.

== Present use ==
The battery was transformed in 2006 to the "Café Musiques" and opened to the public. The architects were Ivan Franic and Michel Garcin with acoustician Maurice Auffret. Work was sponsored by Saint-Quentin-en-Yvelines. The cafe provides a proscenium stage and accommodations for 450 spectators, three rehearsal and recording studios, technical rooms, dressing rooms and administrative offices, with an adjoining cafe.

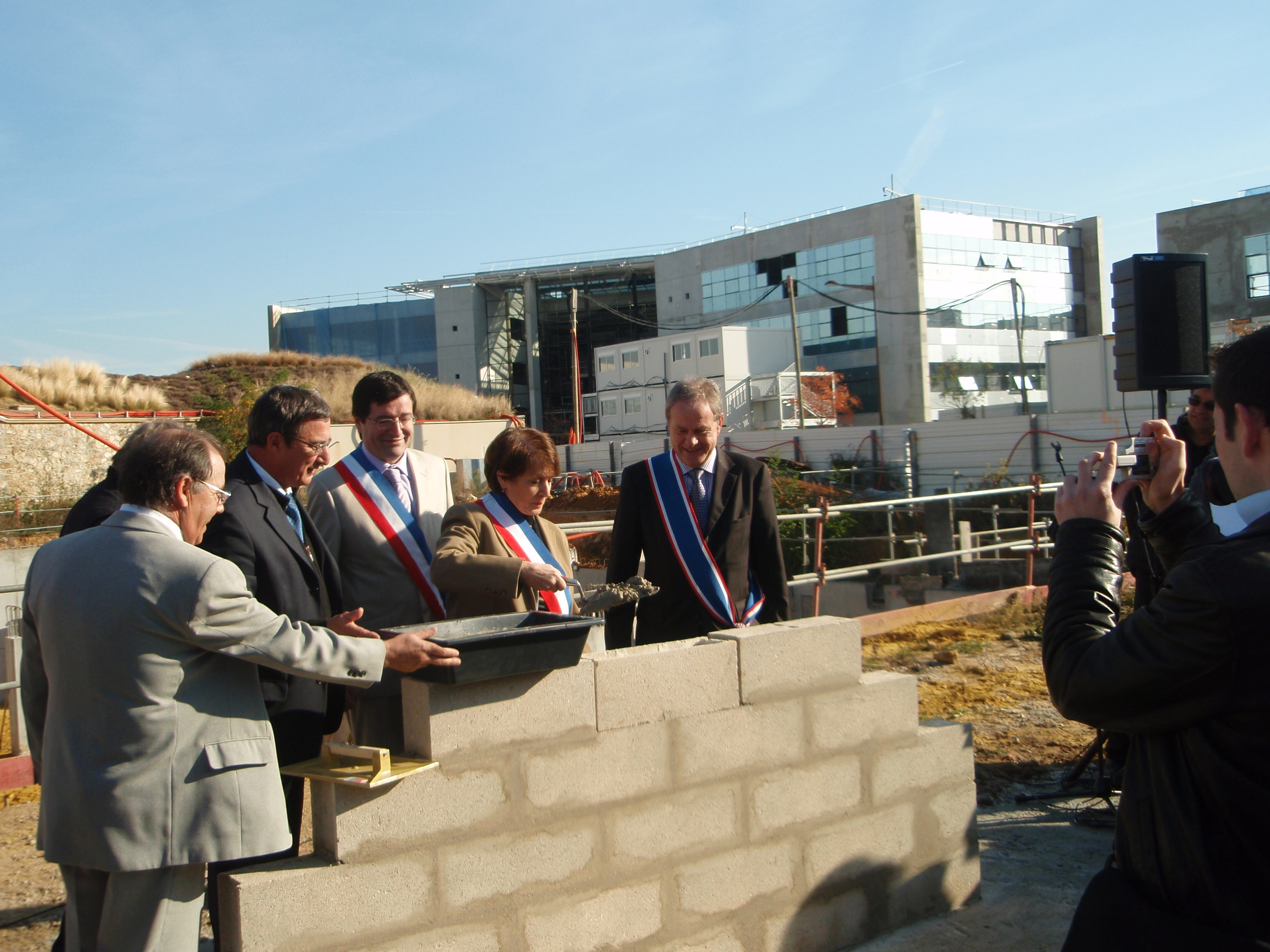
First stone of the music school (18 October 2008)

Work began on the music school in 2008, designed by architect Yann Brunel. The former industrial lands have been redeveloped. Sodexho France moved its headquarters to the development in 2009.

== Gallery ==
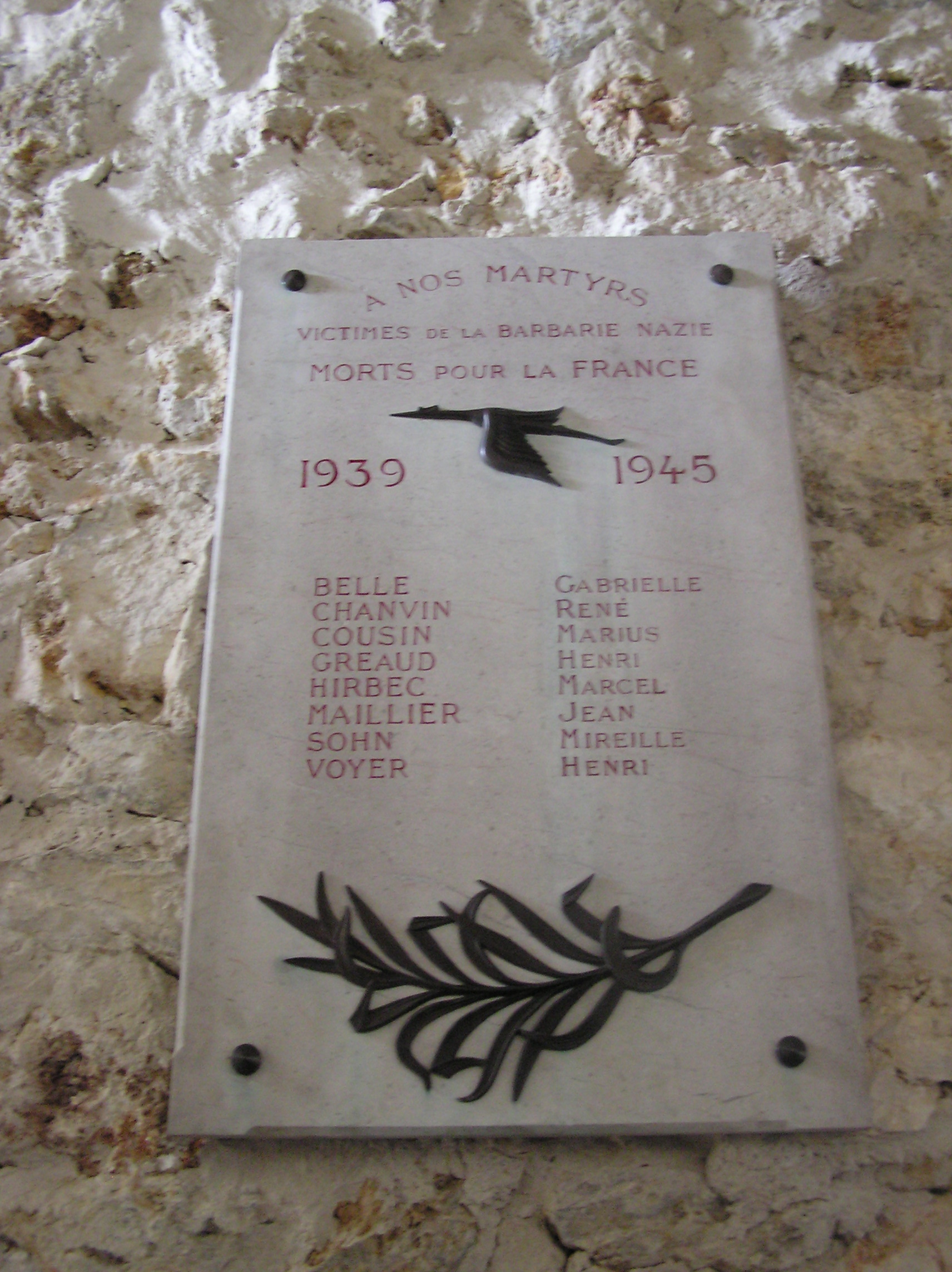
Memorial plaque placed in 2007

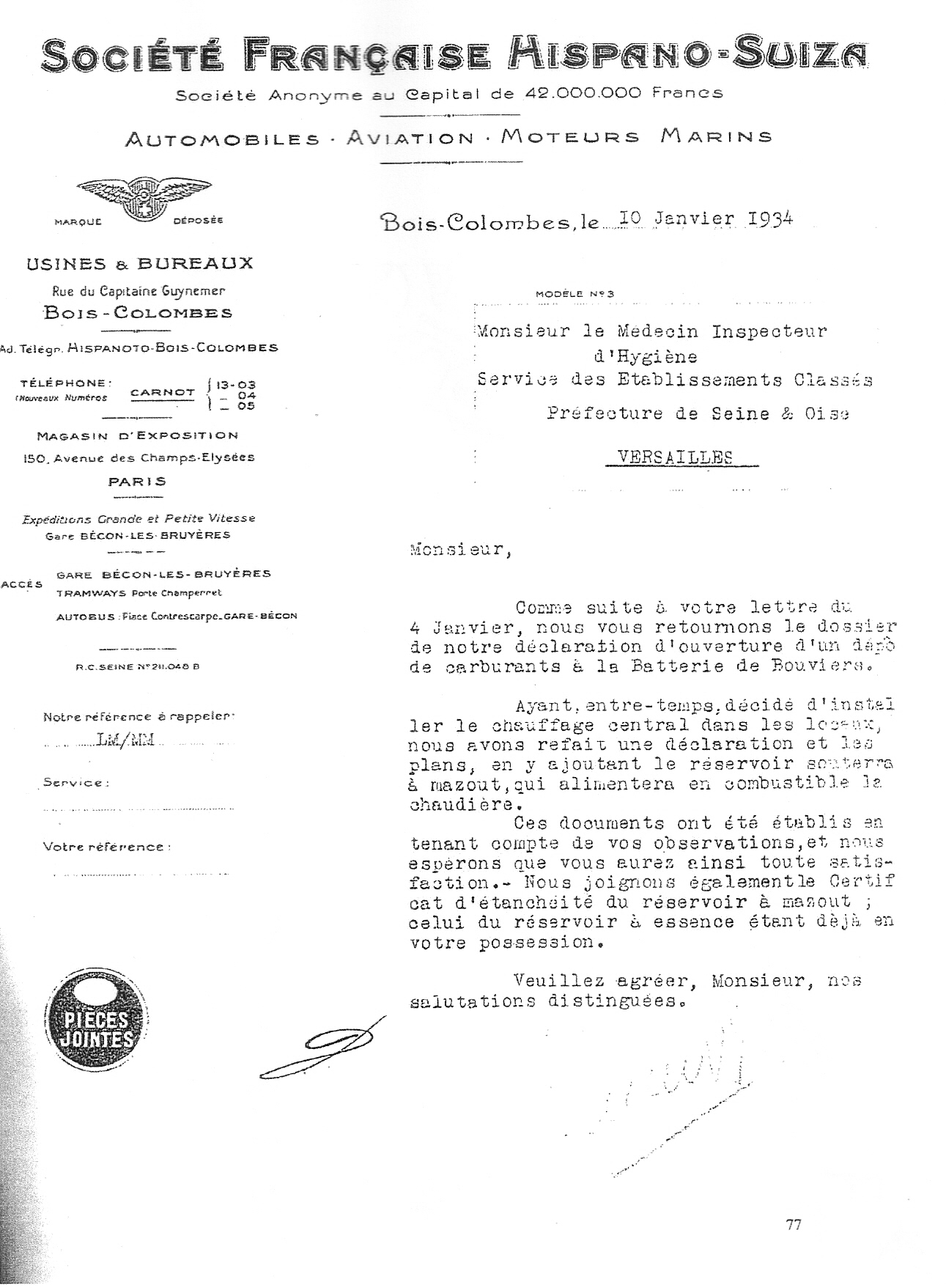
Declaration of work in 1934

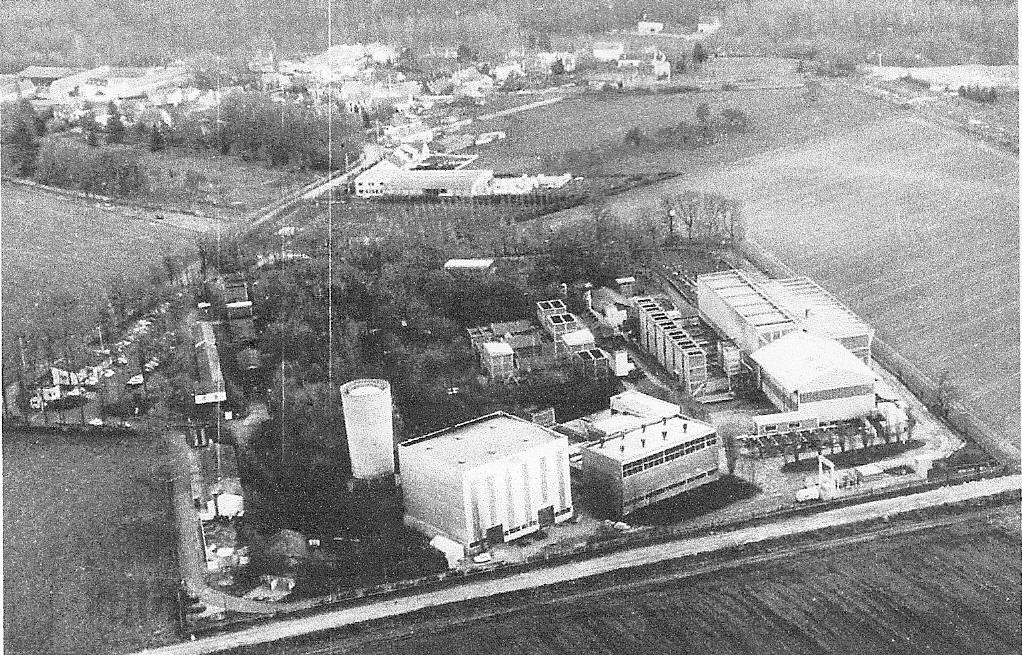
View of the site in 1970 with the village of Bouviers

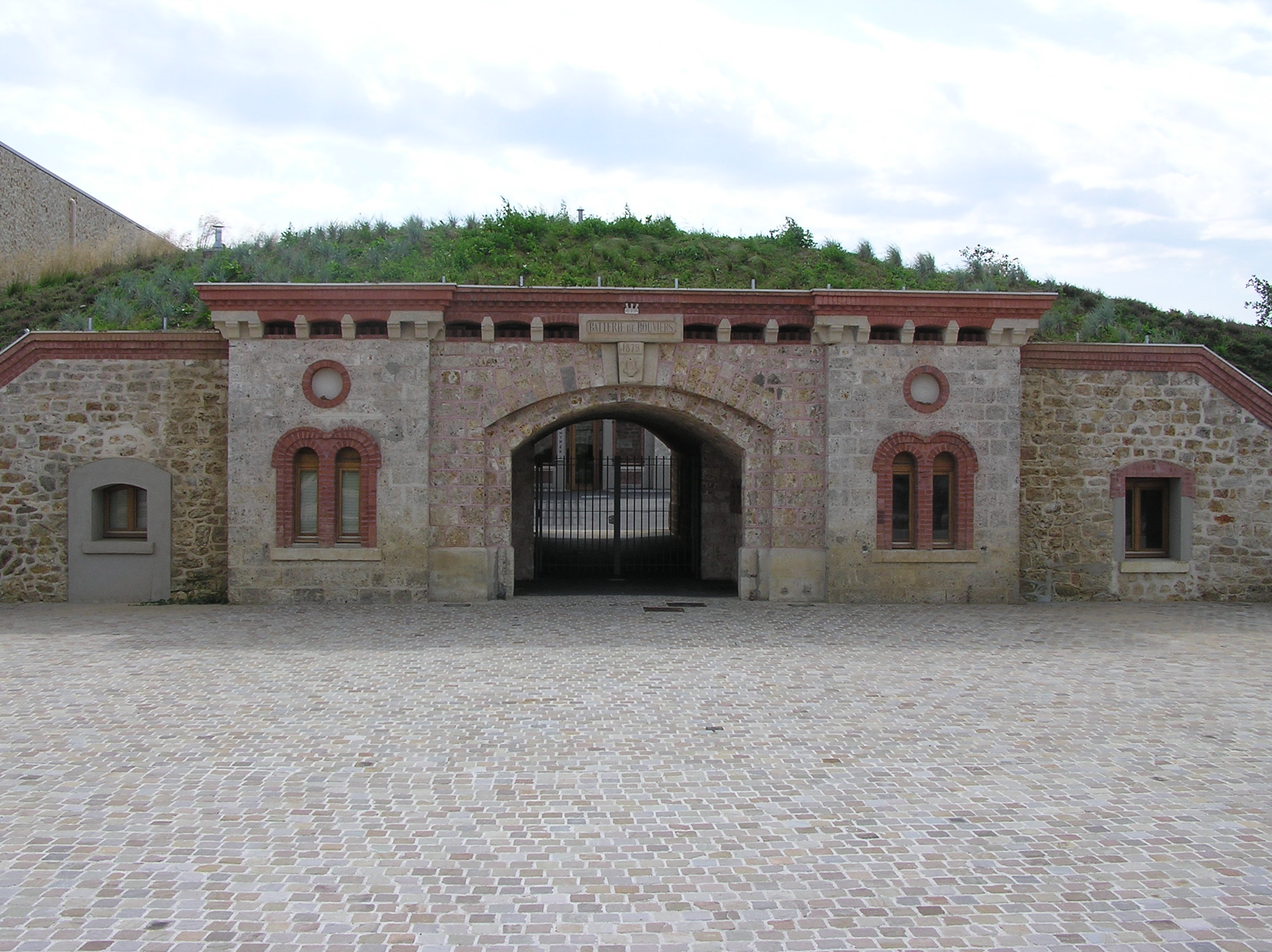
Main entry in 2007

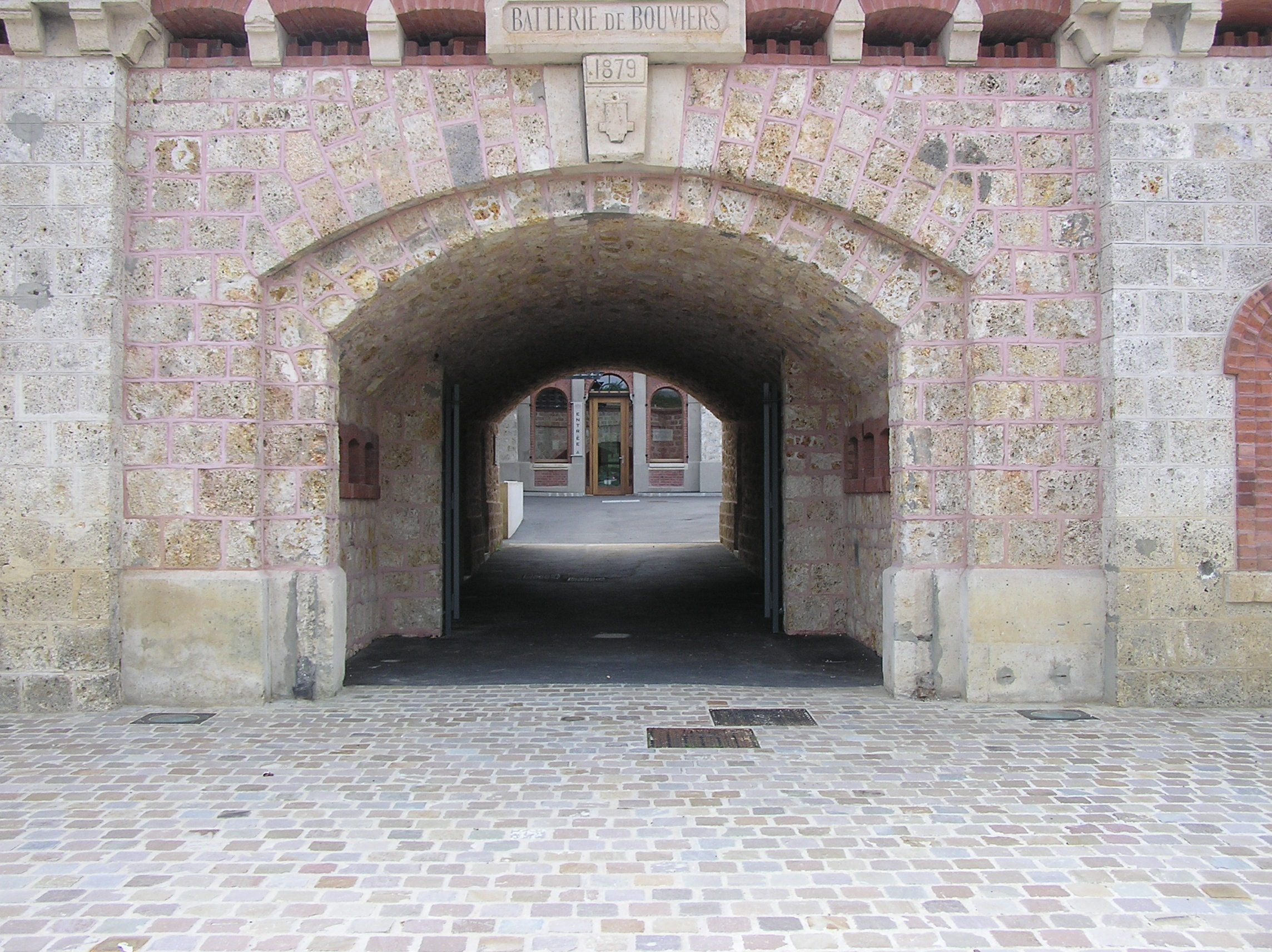
Main entry

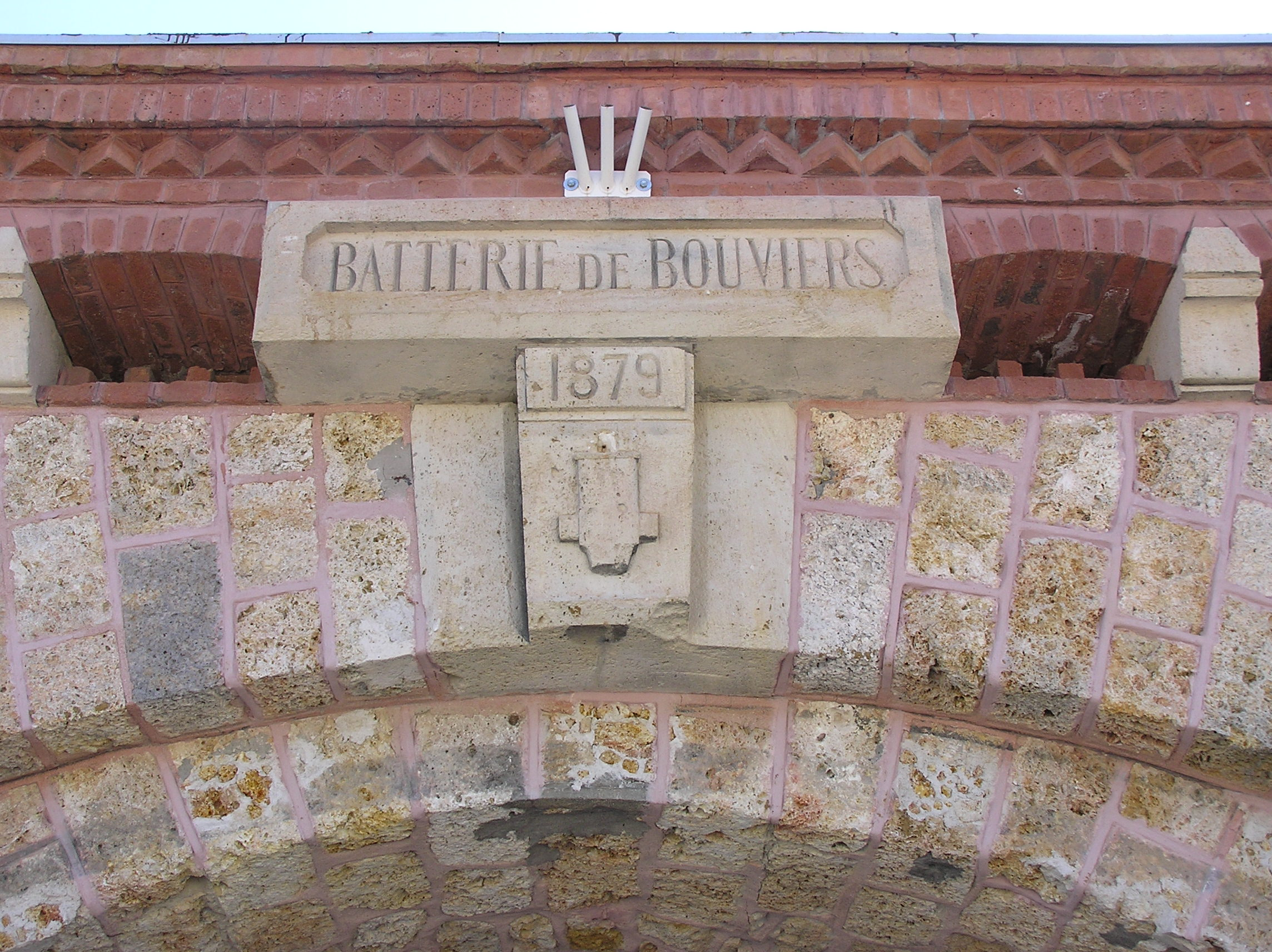
Keystone

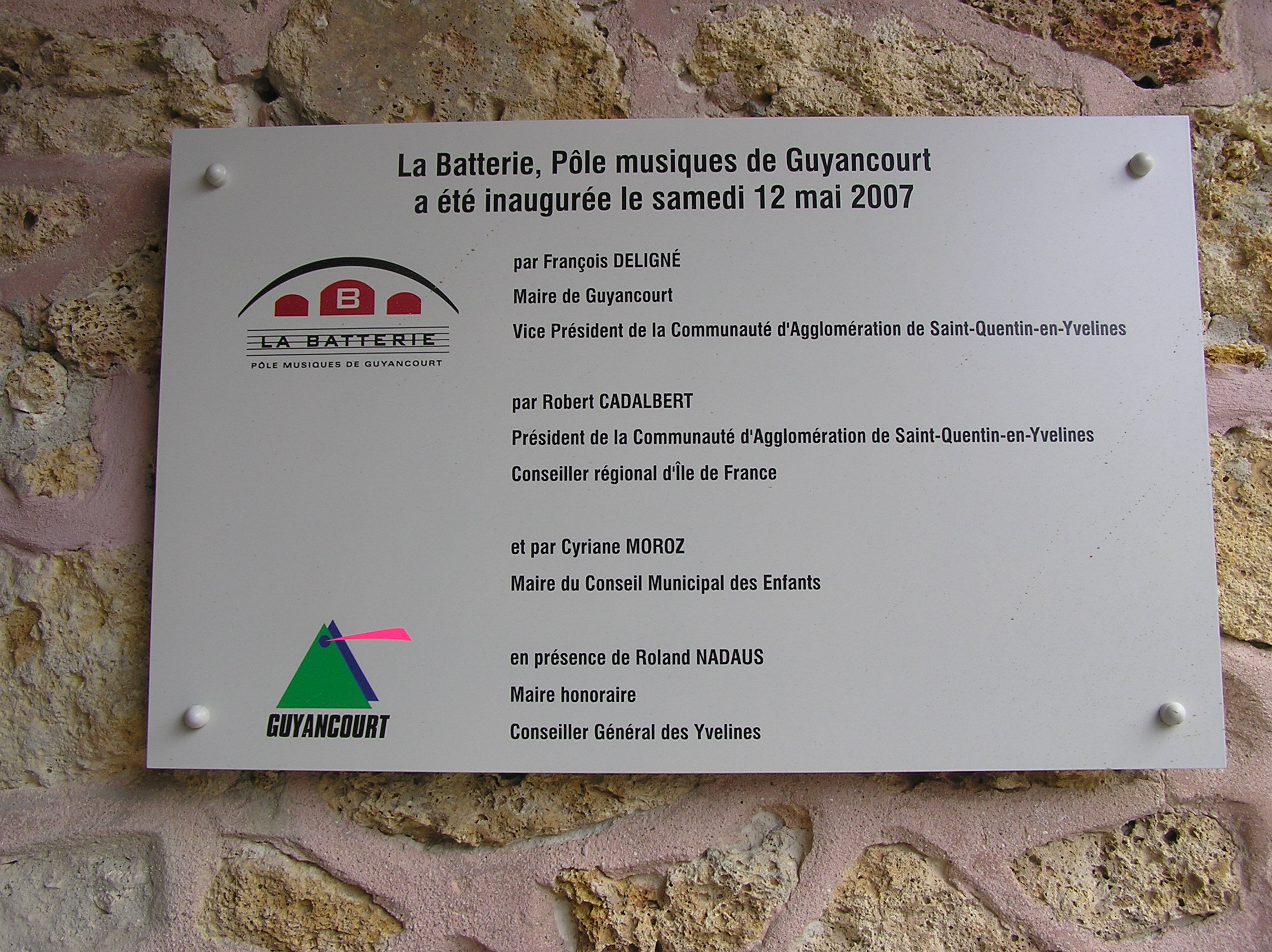

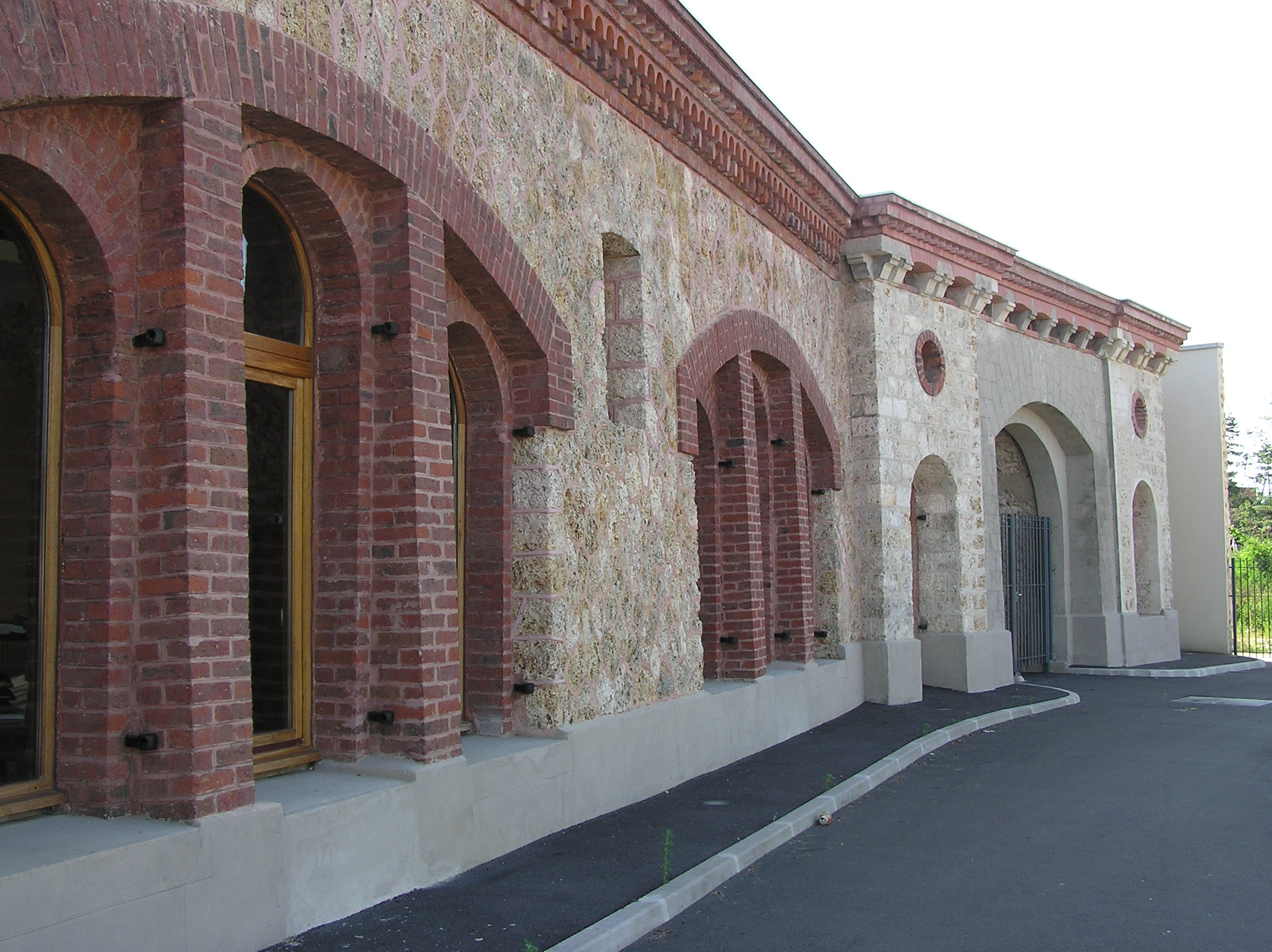

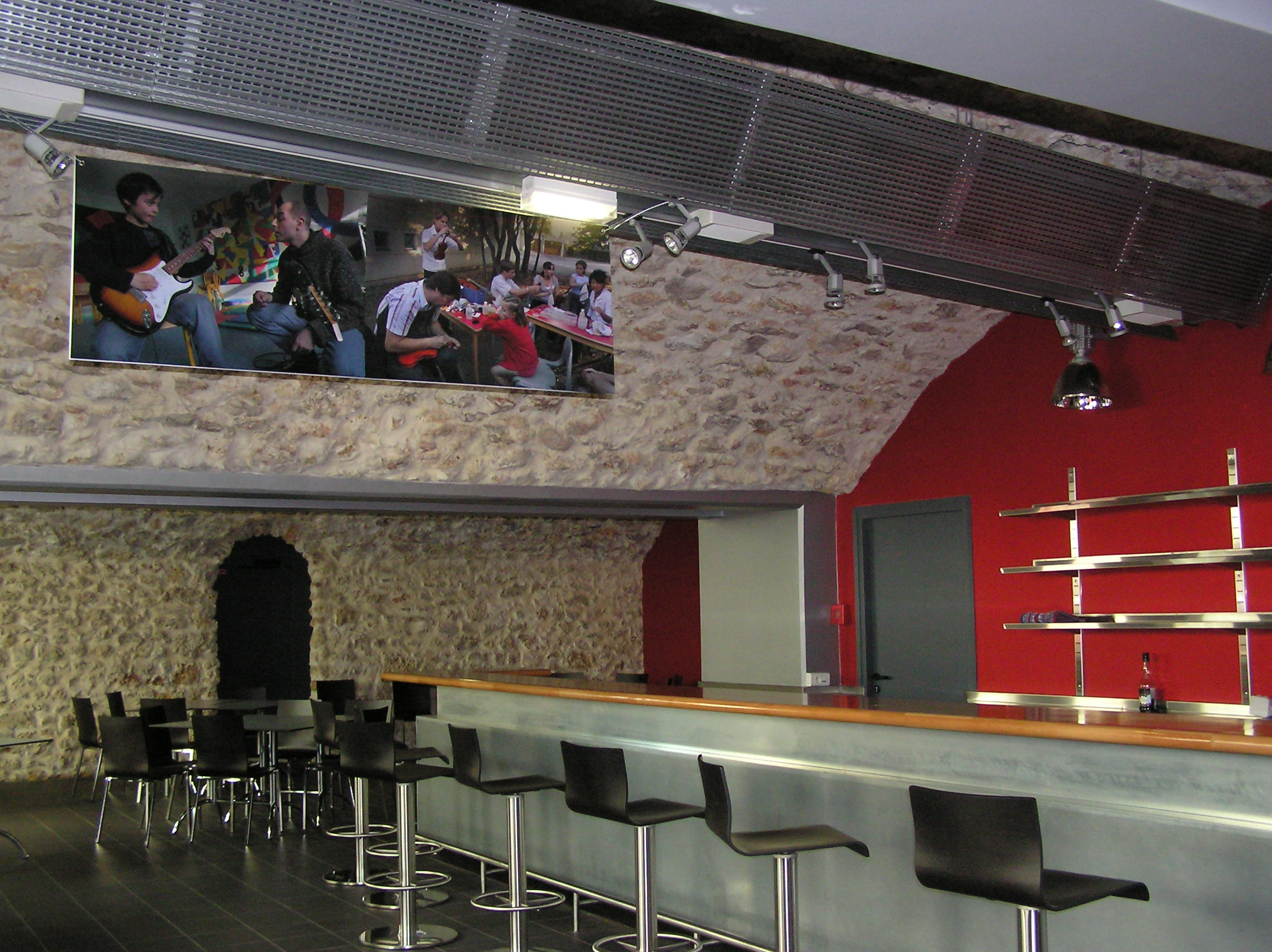
Cafe

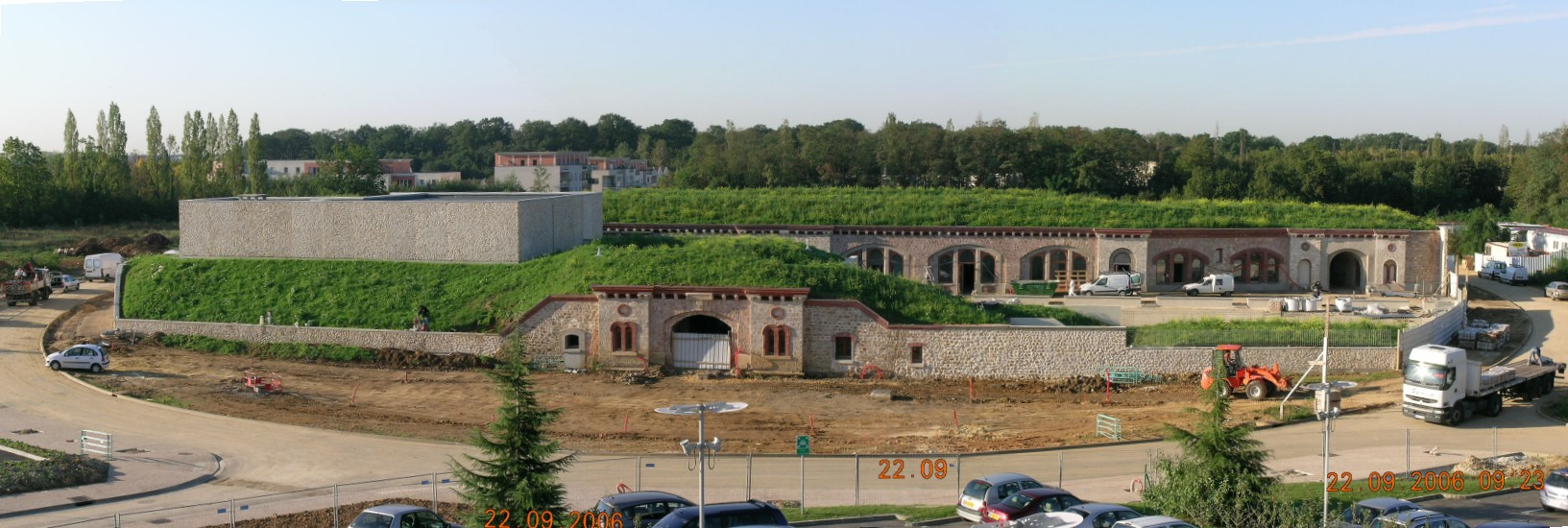
Panoramic image of the battery under rehabilitation in September 2006

== See also ==
- Séré de Rivières system
- Fortifications of Paris in the 19th and 20th centuries
