= Fort de Saint-Cyr =

- Part of Fortifications of Paris, Séré de Rivières system
- Montigny-le-Bretonneux, France
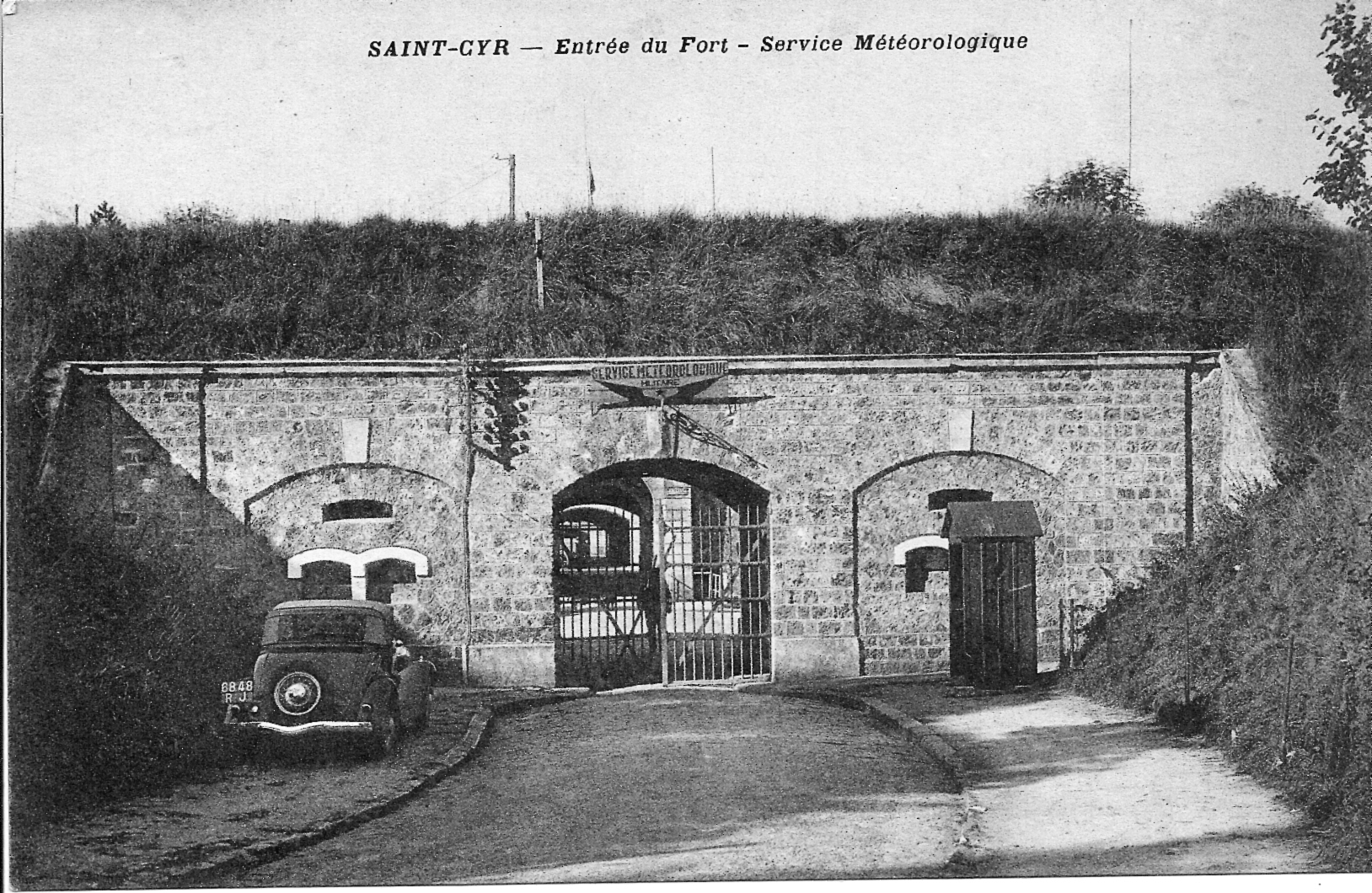

Site information
- Type: Fort
- Owner: French Ministry of Culture
- Controlled by: France
- Open to the public: Occasional
- Condition: Preserved

Location
- Coordinates: 48.79284°N 2.03124°E

Site history
- Built: 1875

The Fort de Saint-Cyr (French pronunciation: [fɔʁ də sɛ̃ siʁ]), located in the commune of Montigny-le-Bretonneux (Yvelines), is one of the forts built at the end of the 19th century to defend Paris. After the first world war the fort was used as an army weather station and arms depot. Classed in 1992 as a monument historique, it is now used as a film depository for the preservation of movies under the Cinémathèque française.

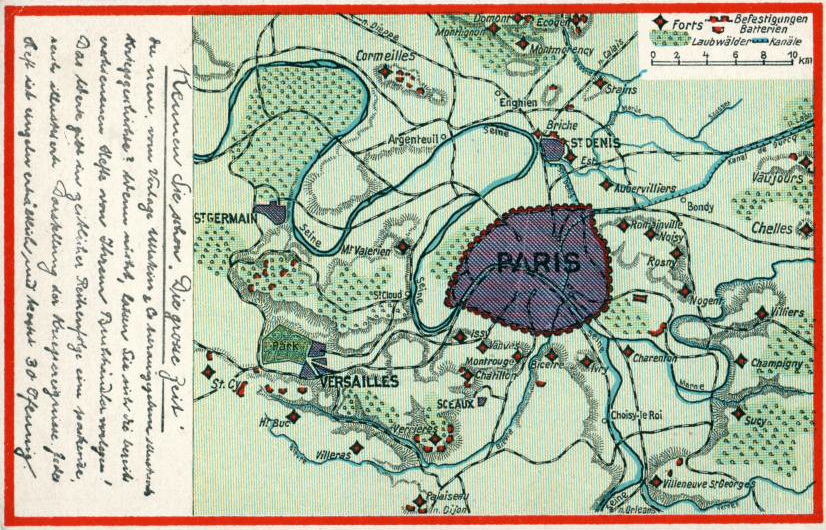
German World War I postcard, showing the defenses of Paris

== History ==
In 1870, France was partly occupied by the Prussian army. As a result of this defeat, the Séré de Rivières system of fortifications was planned and constructed to defend Paris. In total, 18 forts, five redoubts and 34 batteries were built around Paris between 1874 and 1881.

Construction was authorized on 27 March 1874 for a fort to protect the town of Saint-Cyr-l'École. The fort itself was located in what was then the commune of Bois d'Arcy, now in the town limits of Montigny-le-Bretonneux.

Construction on the Fort de Saint-Cyr began in May 1875 and was completed in 1879, with troops installed the same year. The garrison was composed of 26 officers, 56 non-commissioned officers and 1406 soldiers. The fort was defended by 90 artillery pieces. In case of conflict, the fort's stores could provide food for three months and water for six months.

The large trapezoidal fort's main armament was a twin 155mm Mougin turret. The turret remains, but its guns have been removed.

== Meteorological station ==
After the First World War the fort was used as an army weather station and as an arms depot. A school of meteorology was established there after the Second World War.

== Cinémathèque archives ==
Thanks to Henri Langlois, 40,000 volumes of the French Cineclub were stored at Saint-Cyr. at the disposition of the French Ministry of Culture.

== See also ==
- Fortifications of Paris in the 19th and 20th centuries
