= Paris in the Belle Époque =

Historical period

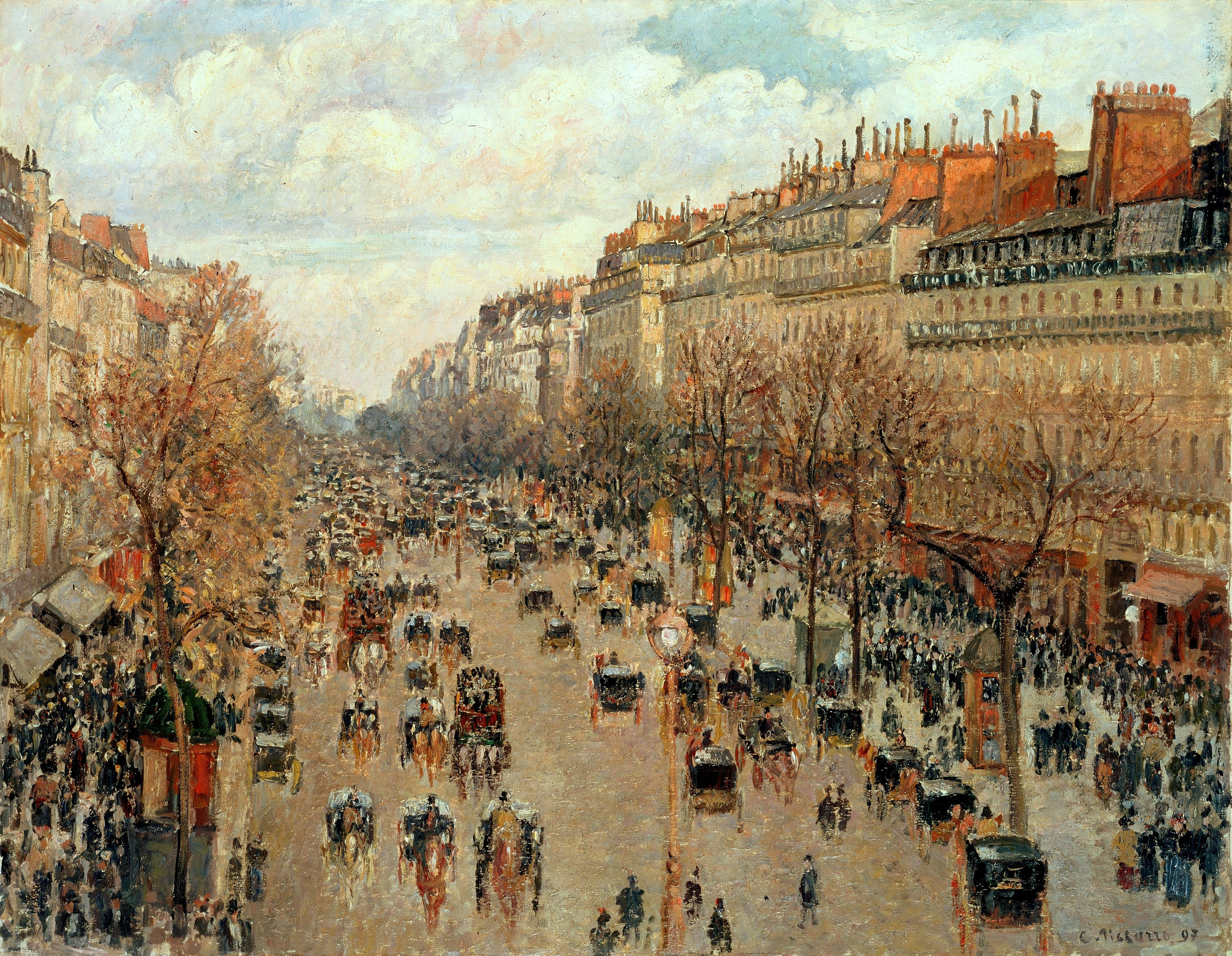
Paris in 1897 — Boulevard Montmartre by Camille Pissarro

In Paris, the Belle Époque (1871–1914) saw the construction of the Eiffel Tower, the Métro, the completion of the Opera, the Rue Réaumur and the beginning of the Basilica of Sacré-Cœur on Montmartre. Three lavish "universal expositions" in 1878, 1889, and 1900 brought millions of visitors to Paris to sample the latest innovations in commerce, art, and technology. Paris was the scene of the first public projection of a motion picture, and the birthplace of the Ballets Russes, Impressionism, and modern art.

The expression Belle Époque ("beautiful era") came into use after the First World War; it was a nostalgic term for what seemed a simpler time of optimism, elegance, and progress.

== Rebuilding after the Commune ==
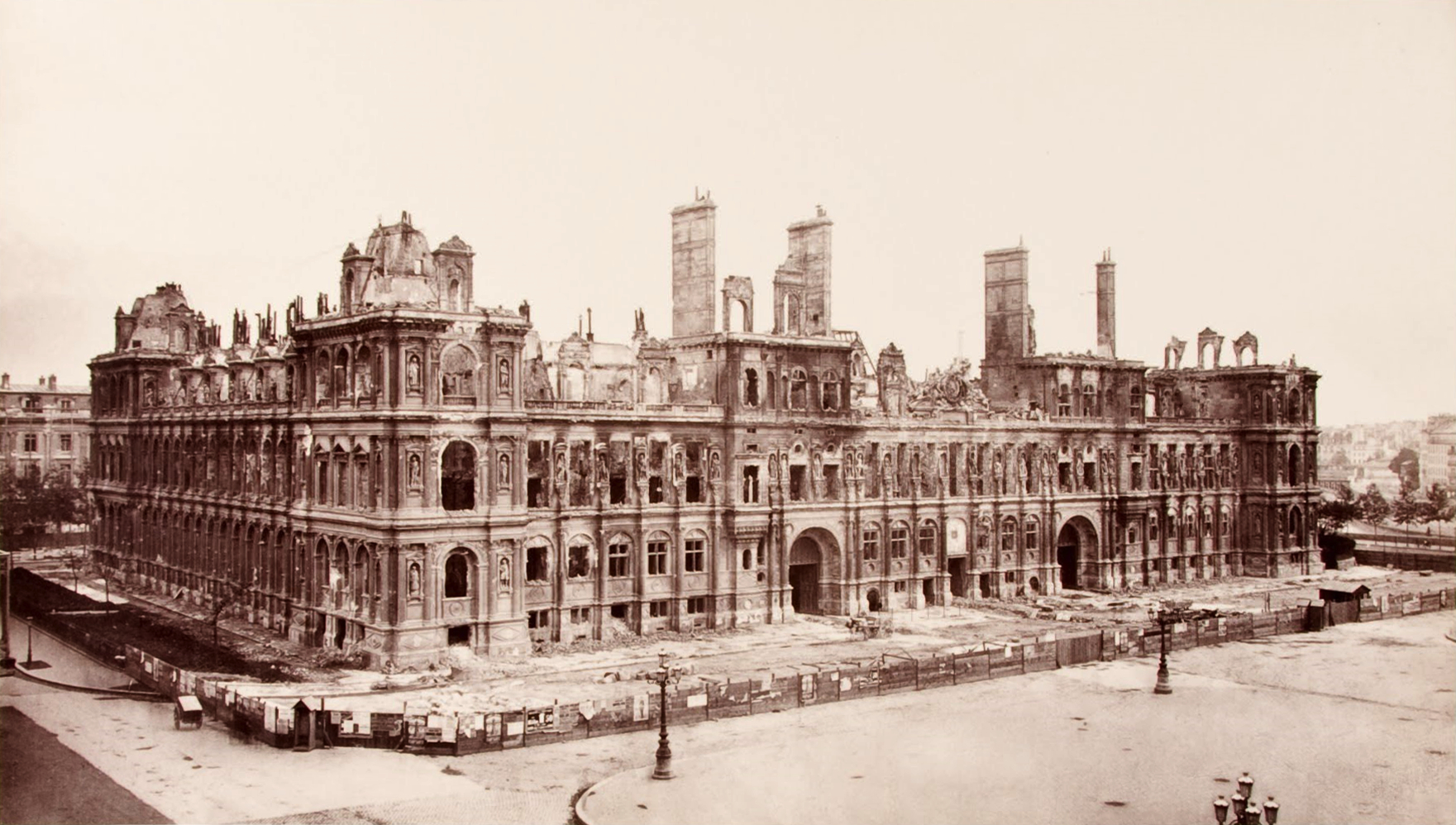
The Hôtel de Ville after it was burned by the Paris Commune (May 1871)

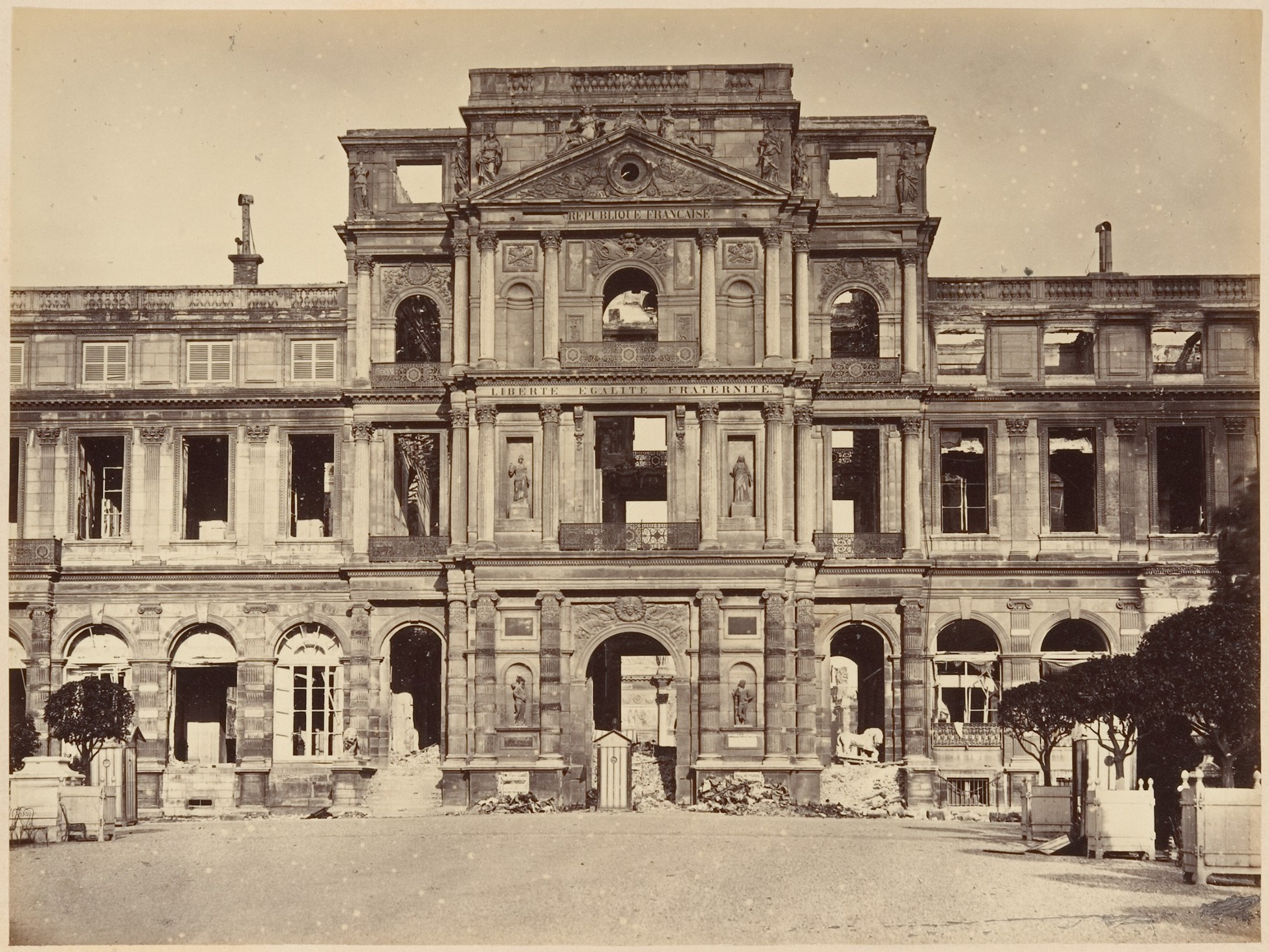
The walls of the Tuileries Palace after arson by the Commune

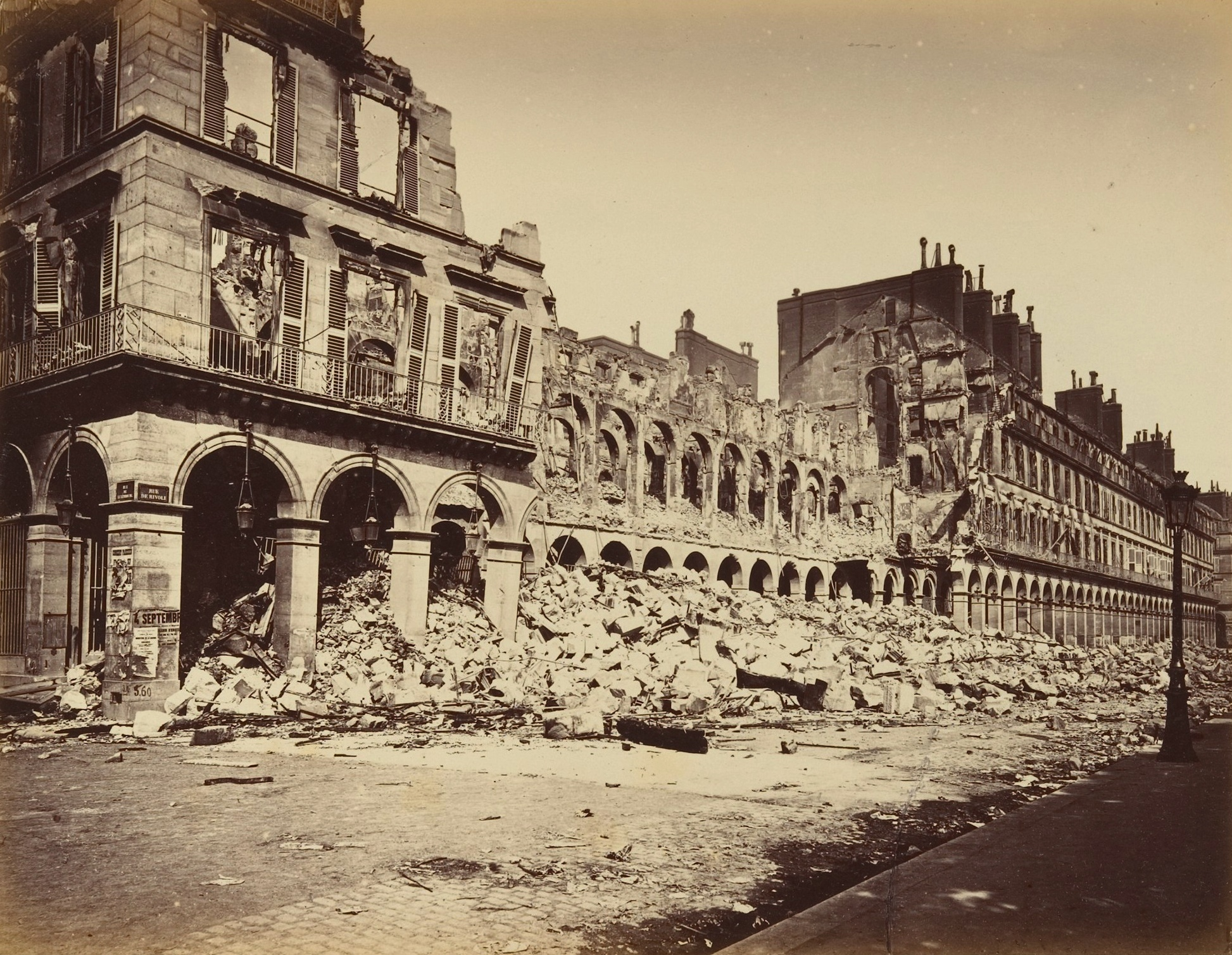
Ruins of the Ministry of Finance on the Rue de Rivoli

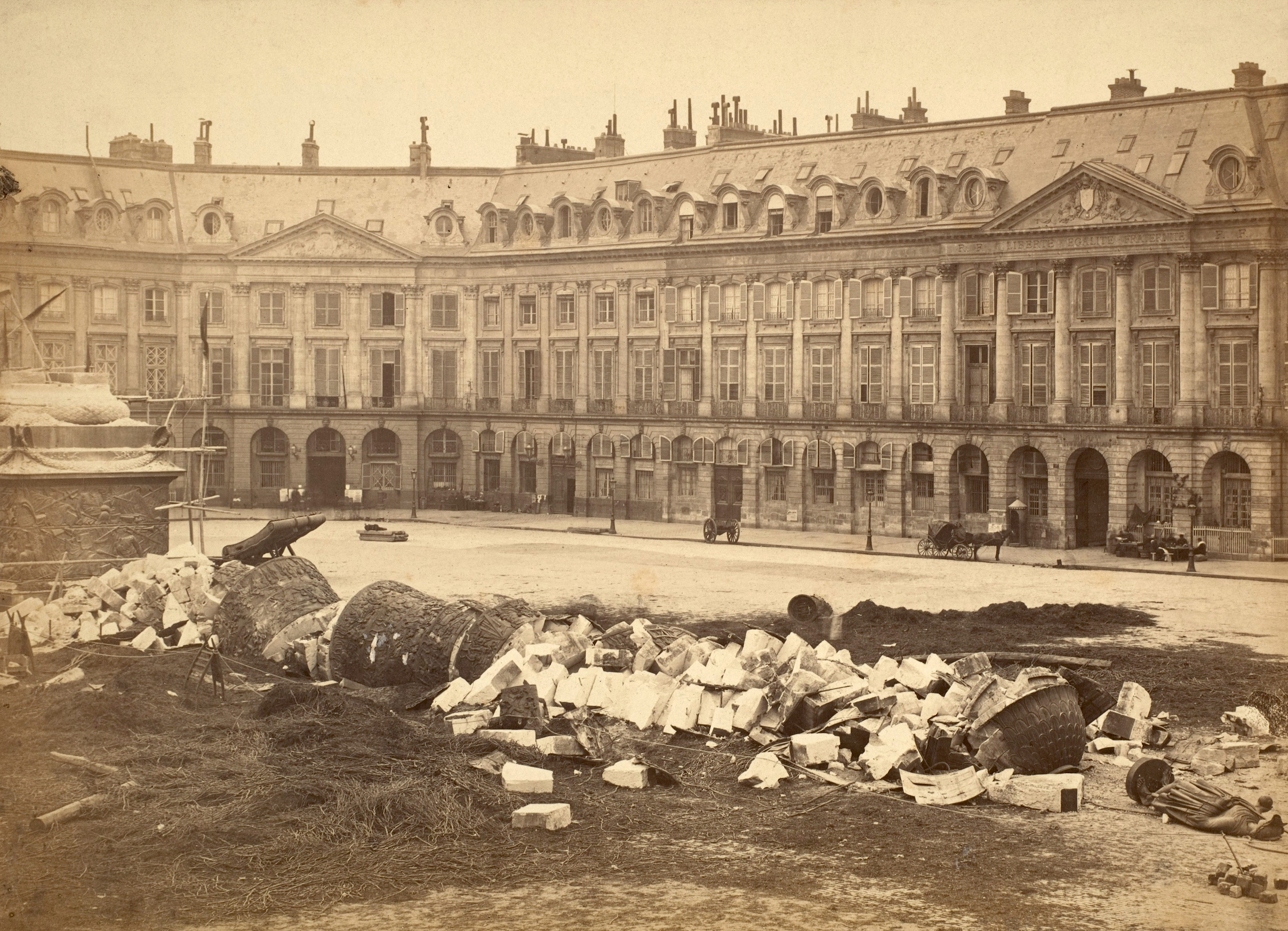
Remains of the column on Place Vendôme

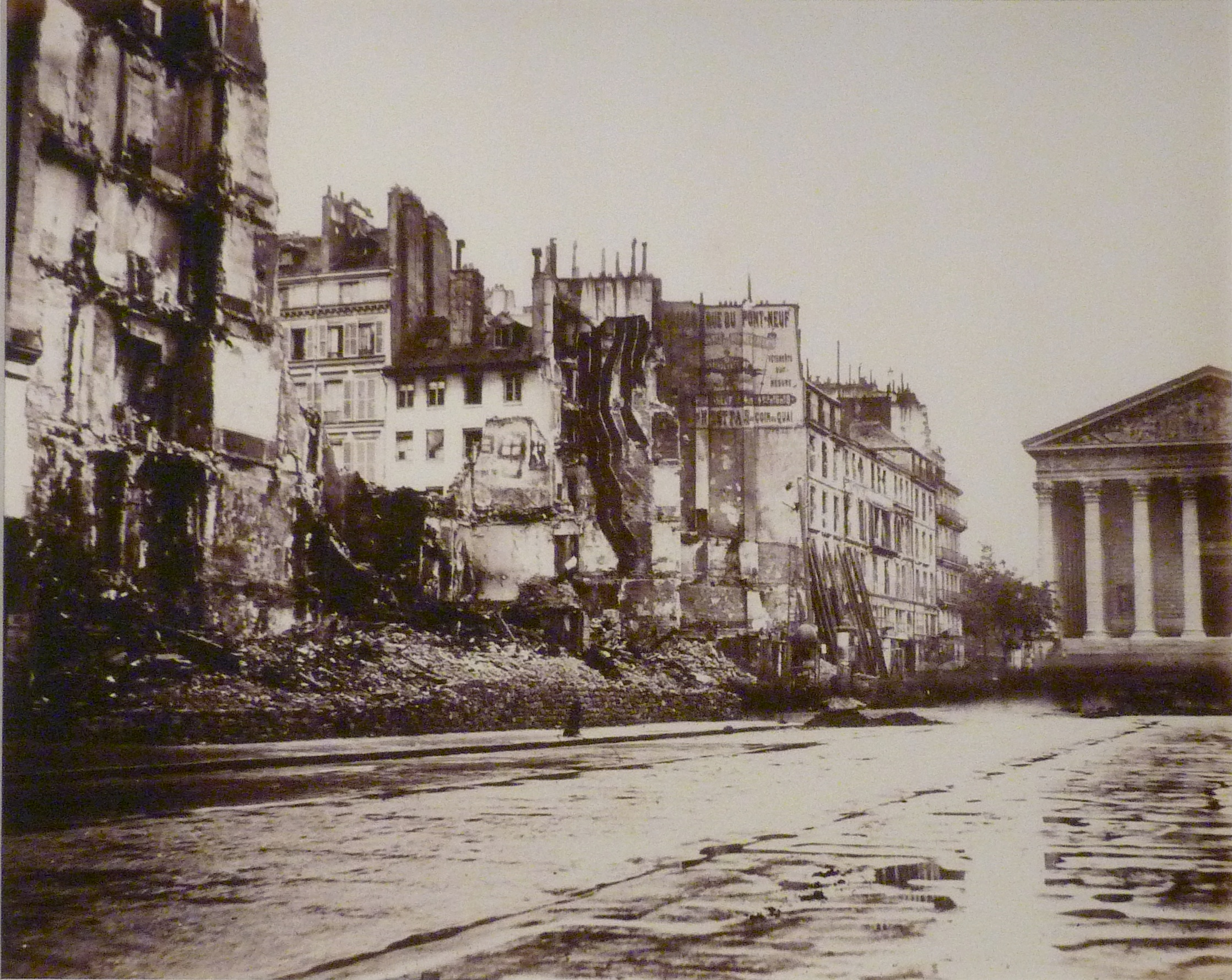
Rue Royale and the Church of the Madeleine

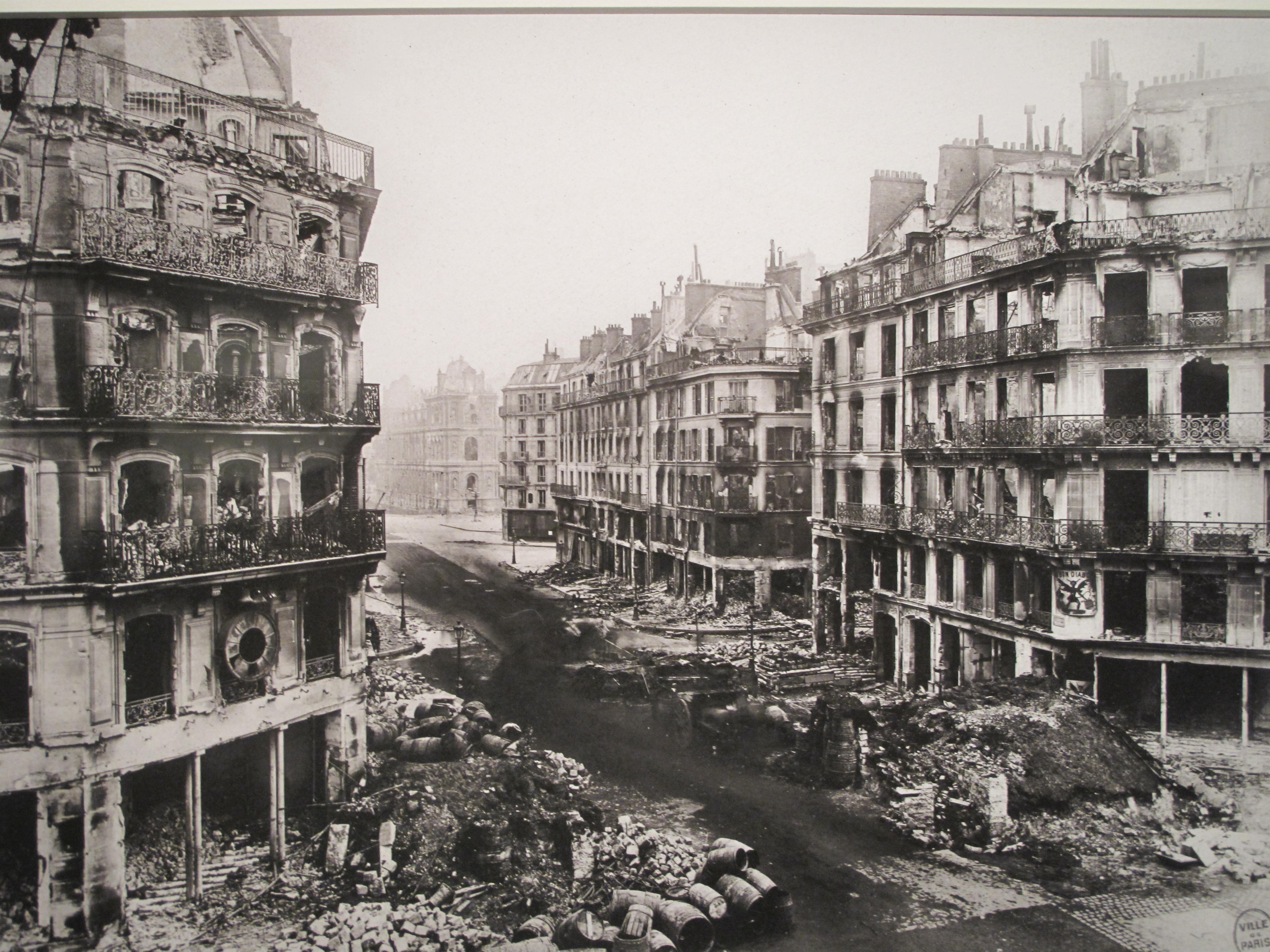
Ruins along the Rue de Rivoli, scene of street battles between the Commune and Army

After the violent end of the Paris Commune in May 1871, the city was governed by martial law under the strict surveillance of the national government. At the time, Paris was not actually the capital of France. The government and parliament had moved to Versailles in March 1871 once the Paris Commune took power, and they did not return to Paris until 1879, although the Senate returned earlier to its home in the Luxembourg Palace.

The end of the Commune left the city's population deeply divided. Gustave Flaubert described the atmosphere in the city in early June 1871: "One half of the population of Paris wants to strangle the other half, and the other half has the same idea; you can read it in the eyes of people passing by." This sentiment soon became secondary to the need to reconstruct the buildings that had been destroyed in the last days of the Commune. The Communards had burned the Hôtel de Ville (including all the city archives), the Tuileries Palace, the Palais de Justice, the Prefecture of Police, the Ministry of Finances, the Cour des Comptes, the State Council building at the Palais-Royal, and many others. Several streets, particularly the Rue de Rivoli, had also been badly damaged by the fighting. Besides the cost of reconstruction, the new government was obliged to pay an indemnity of 210 million francs in gold to the victorious German Empire as reparations for the disastrous Franco-Prussian War of 1870. On 4 August 1871, at the first meeting of the city council after the Commune, the new Prefect of the Seine, Léon Say, put forward a plan to borrow 350 million francs for reconstruction and indemnity payments. The city's bankers and businessmen quickly raised the money, and the reconstruction was soon underway.

The Conseil d'État and Palais de la Légion d'Honneur (Hôtel de Salm) were rebuilt in their original style. The new Hôtel de Ville was built on the lines of a more picturesque Neo-Renaissance style than the original that was based on the appearance of the Château de Chambord in the Loire Valley, with a façade decorated with statues of outstanding personages who contributed to the history and fame of Paris. The destroyed Ministry of Finance on the Rue de Rivoli was replaced by a grand hotel, while the Ministry moved into the Richelieu wing of the Louvre Palace, where it remained until 1989. The ruined Cour des Comptes on the Left Bank was replaced by the Gare d'Orléans, also known under the name Gare d'Orsay, now the Musée d'Orsay. The one difficult decision was the Tuileries Palace, originally built in the 16th century by Marie de' Medici as a royal residence. The interior had been entirely destroyed by fire, but the walls were still largely intact. The walls remained standing for ten years while the fate of the ruins was debated. Baron Haussmann, in retirement, appealed for a restoration of the building as a historic monument, and there was a proposal to turn it into a new museum of modern art. In 1881, however, a new Chamber of Deputies more sympathetic to the Commune than previous governments decided that it was too much a symbol of the monarchy and had the walls pulled down.

On 23 July 1873, the National Assembly (the legislature of the early French Third Republic that was replaced by the Chamber of Deputies and a Senate in 1875) endorsed the project of building a basilica at the site where the uprising of the Paris Commune had begun. The gesture was intended as a symbolic means to atone for the sufferings of Paris during the Franco-Prussian War and the Commune. The Basilica of Sacré-Cœur was subsequently built in a Neo-Byzantine style and paid for by public subscription. It quickly became one of the most recognizable landmarks in Paris during construction, but was not finished until 1919.

== The Parisians ==
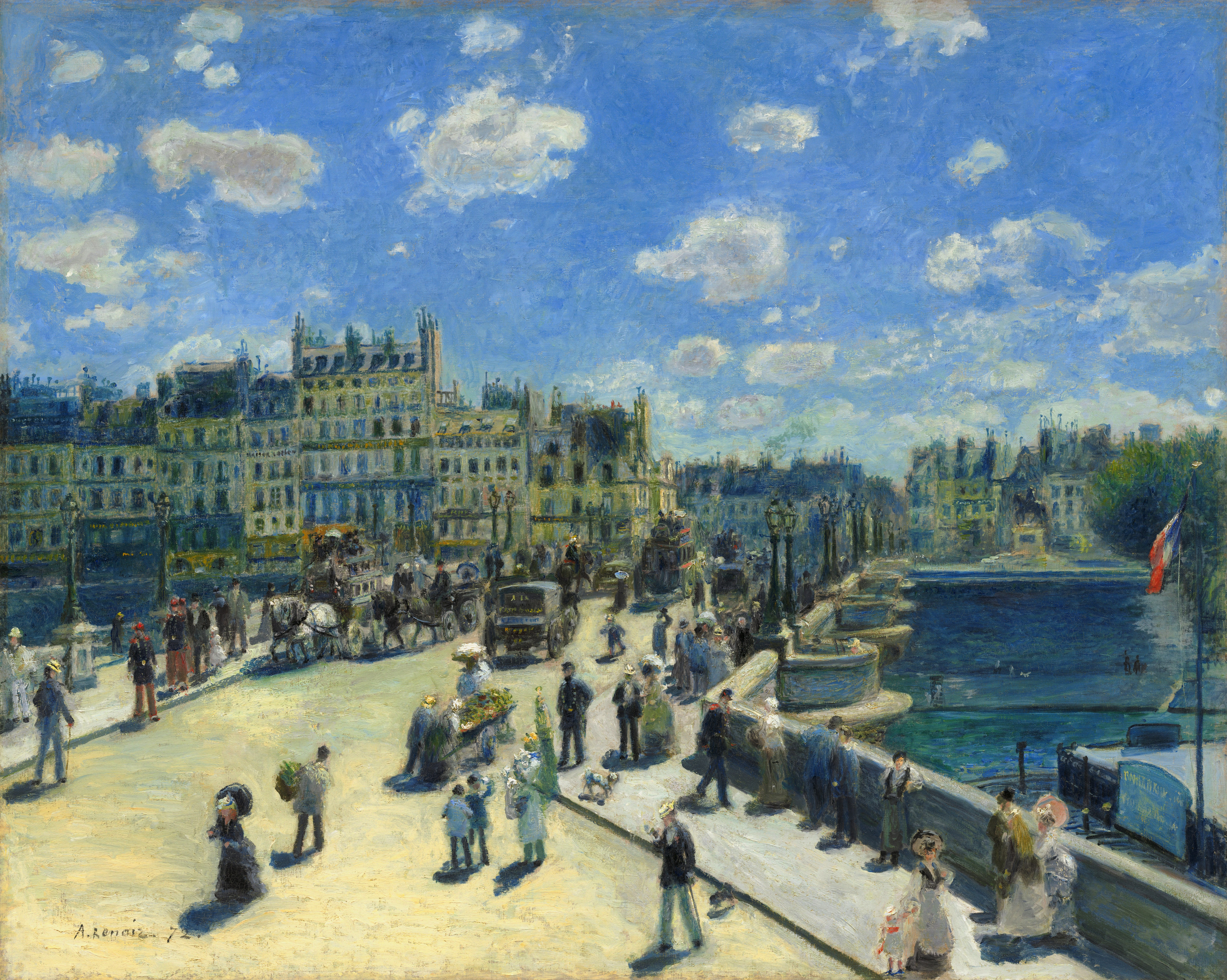
Le Pont-Neuf by Pierre-Auguste Renoir (1872)

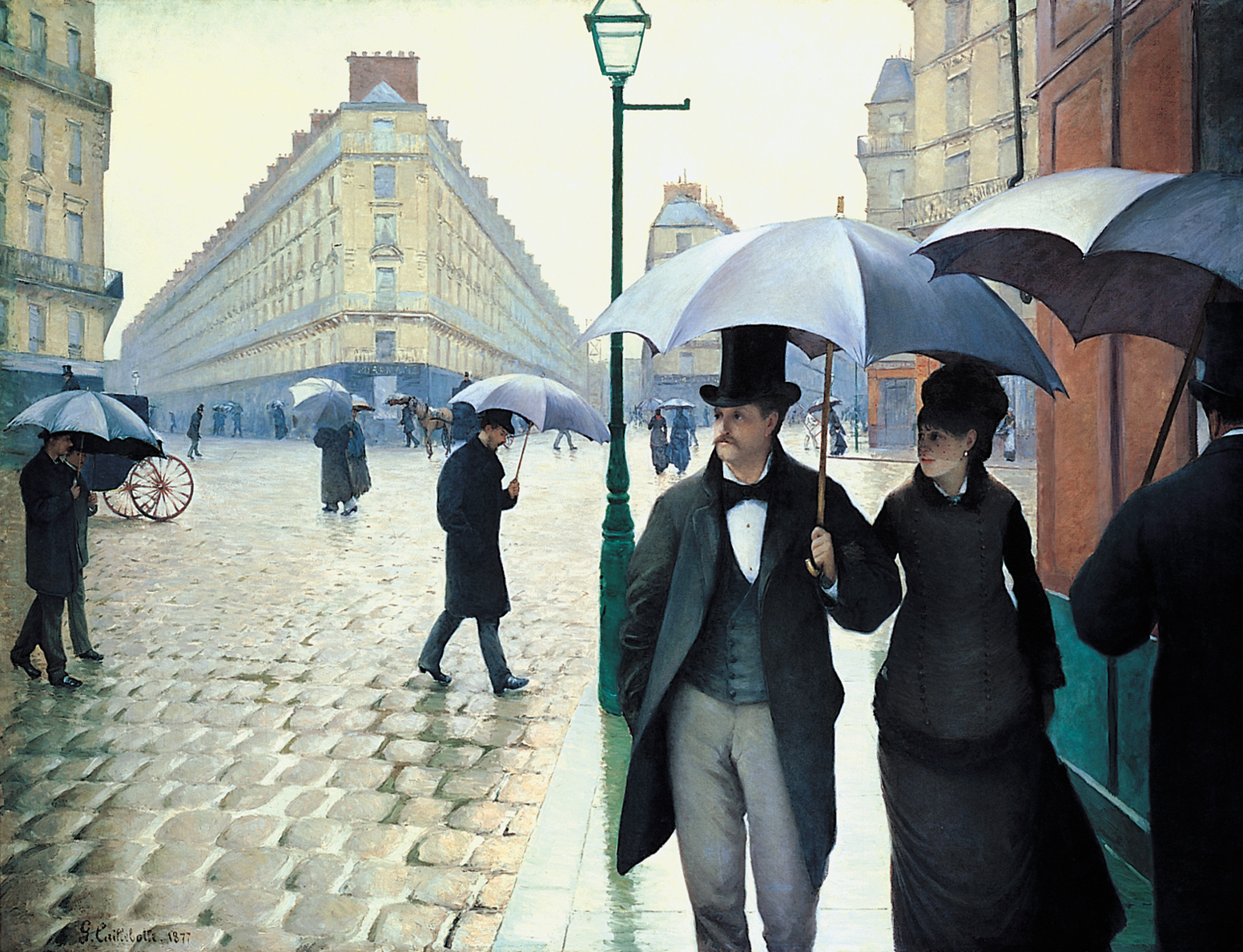
Paris Street; Rainy Day by Caillebotte (1877)

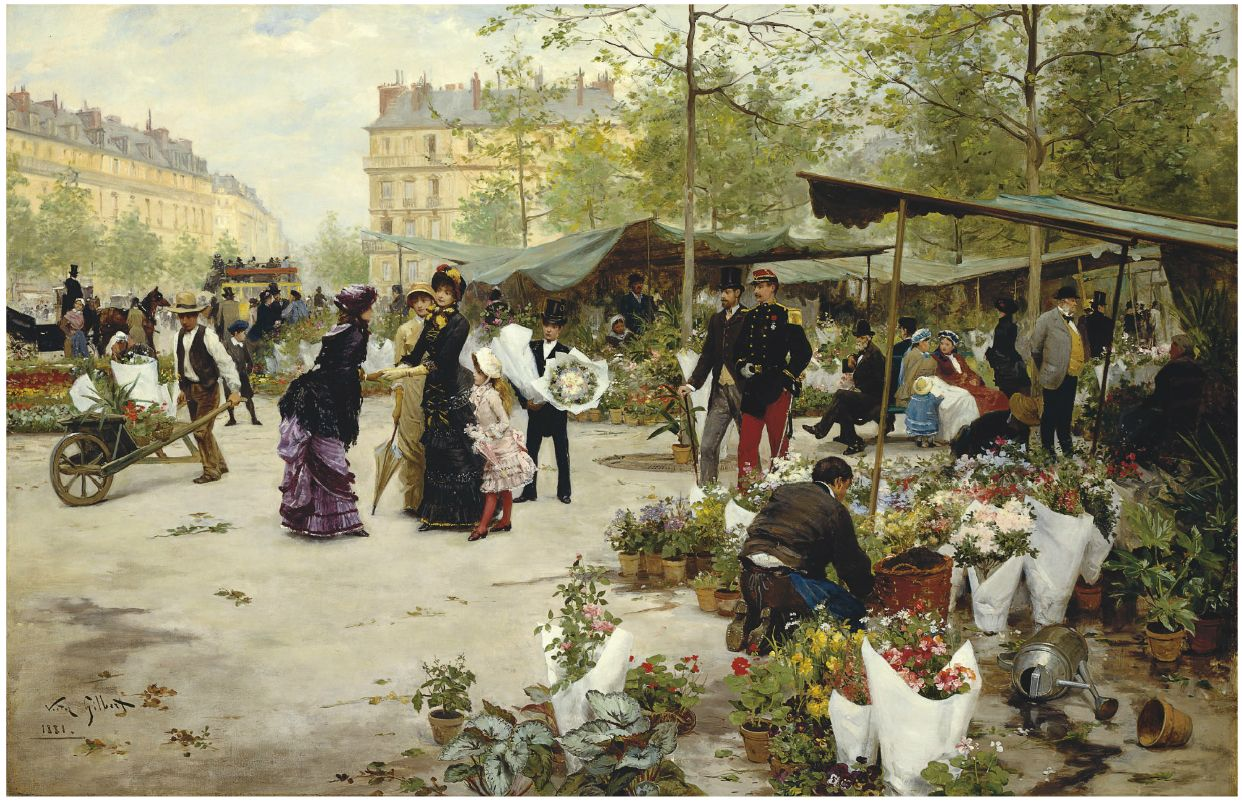
The Lower Market by Victor Gabriel Gilbert (1881)

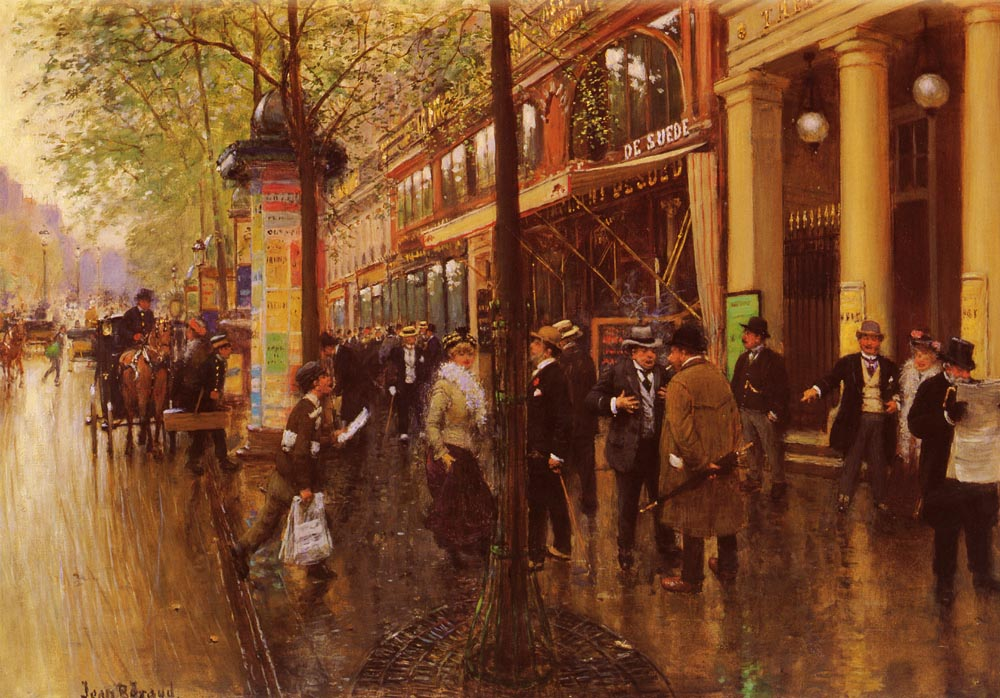
The Grand Boulevards, exit of the Theatre des Varietes by Jean Béraud (between 1875 and 1890s)

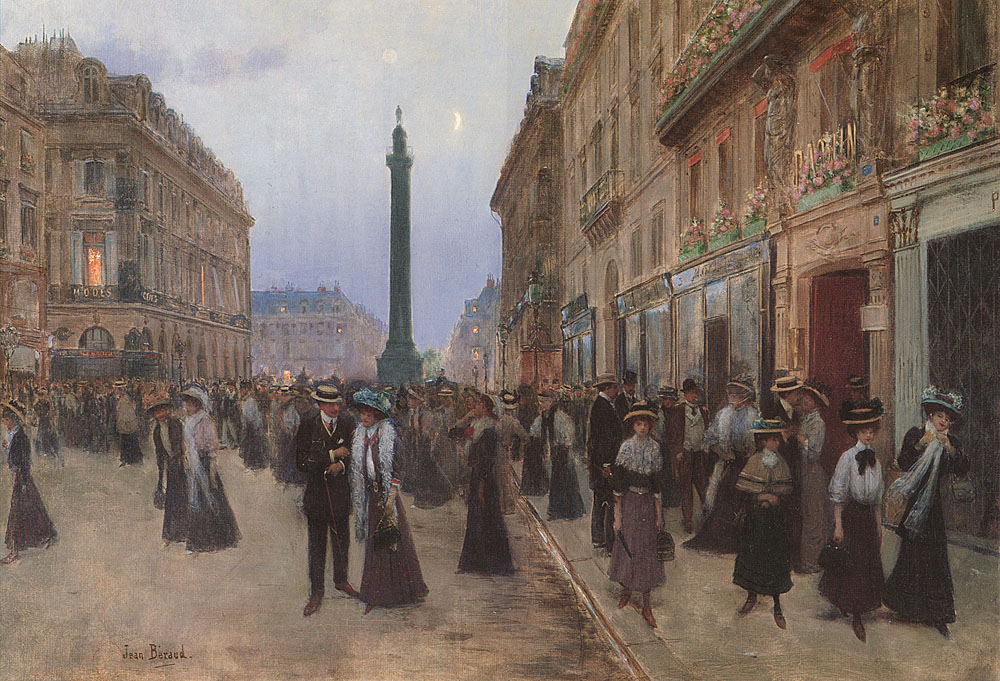
Rue de la Paix by Jean Béraud (1907)

The population of Paris was 1,851,792 in 1872, at the beginning the Belle Époque. By 1911, it reached 2,888,107, higher than the population today. Near the end of the Second Empire and the beginning of the Belle Époque, between 1866 and 1872, the population of Paris grew only 1.5%. Then the population surged by 14.09% between 1876 and 1881, only to slow again to a 3.3% growth between 1881 and 1886. After that, it grew very slowly until the end of the Belle Époque. It reached a historic high of almost three million persons in 1921 before beginning a long decline until the early 21st century.

In 1886, about one-third of the population of Paris (35.7%) had been born in Paris. More than half (56.3%) had been born in other departments of France and about 8% outside France. In 1891, Paris was the most cosmopolitan of European capital cities, with 75 foreign-born residents for every thousand inhabitants. In comparison, there were only 24 per thousand in Saint Petersburg, 22 in London and Vienna, and 11 in Berlin. The largest communities of immigrants were Belgians, Germans, Italians and Swiss, with between 20 and 28,000 persons from each country. Followed by these were about 10,000 from Great Britain and an equal number from Russia; 8,000 from Luxembourg; 6,000 South Americans and 5,000 Austrians. There were also 445 Africans, 439 Danes, 328 Portuguese and 298 Norwegians. Certain nationalities were concentrated in specific professions. Italians were concentrated in the businesses of making ceramics, shoes, sugar and conserves. Germans were concentrated in leather-working, brewing, baking and charcuterie. Swiss and Germans were predominant in businesses making watches and clocks, and accounted for a large proportion of the domestic servants.

The remnants of old Paris aristocracy and the new aristocracy of bankers, financiers and entrepreneurs mostly had their residences in the 8th arrondissement, from the Champs-Élysées to the Madeleine church; in the "Quartier de l'Europe" and "Butte Chaillot" (now the area of the Place Charles de Gaulle); the Faubourg Saint-Honoré; the "Quartier Saint-Georges", from the Rue Vivienne and the Palais-Royal to Roule; and the Plain of Monceau. On the Right Bank, they lived in Le Marais. On the Left Bank, they lived on the south of the Latin Quarter, at Notre-Dame-des-Champs and Odéon; near Les Invalides; and at the École Militaire. The less affluent shop owners lived from the Porte Saint-Denis to Les Halles to the west of the Boulevard de Sébastopol. The middle class employees of enterprises, small businesses and government lived closer to the center of the city along the "Grands Boulevards"; in the 10th arrondissement; in the 1st and 2nd arrondissements near the Paris Bourse (Stock Exchange); in the Sentier quarter near Les Halles; and in Le Marais.

Under Napoleon III, Baron Haussmann demolished the poorest, most crowded and historical neighborhoods in the center of the city to make room for the new boulevards and squares. The working-class Parisians moved out of the center toward the edges of the city, particularly to Belleville and Ménilmontant in the east; to Clignancourt and the Quartier des Grandes-Carrières to the north; and on the Left Bank to the area around the Gare d'Austerlitz, Javel and Grenelle, usually to neighborhoods that were close to their places of work. Small quarters of working-class Parisians remained in the center of the city, mainly on the sides of the Montagne Sainte-Geneviève in the Latin Quarter near the Sorbonne and the Jardin des Plantes and along the covered Bièvre River, where the tanneries had been located for centuries.

Paris was both the richest and poorest city in France. Twenty-four percent of the wealth in France was found in the Seine department, but 55% of burials of Parisians were made in the section for those unable to pay. In 1878, two-thirds of Parisians paid less than 300 francs a year for their lodging, a very small amount at the time. An 1882 study of Parisians, based on funeral costs, concluded that 27% of Parisians were upper or middle class, while 73% were poor or indigent. Incomes varied greatly according to the neighborhood: in the 8th arrondissement, there were eight poor persons for ten upper or middle class residents; in the 13th, 19th and 20th arrondissements, there were seven or eight poor for every well-off resident.

=== The Apaches of Paris ===
Apaches was a term that was introduced by Paris newspapers in 1902 for young Parisians who engaged in petty crime and sometimes fought each other or the police. They usually lived in Belleville and Charonne. Their activities were described in lurid terms by the popular press, and they were blamed for all varieties of crime in the city. In September 1907, the newspaper Le Gaulois described an Apache as "the man who lives on the margin of society, ready to do anything, except to take a regular job, the miserable who breaks in a doorway, or stabs a passer-by for nothing, just for pleasure."

== Government and politics ==
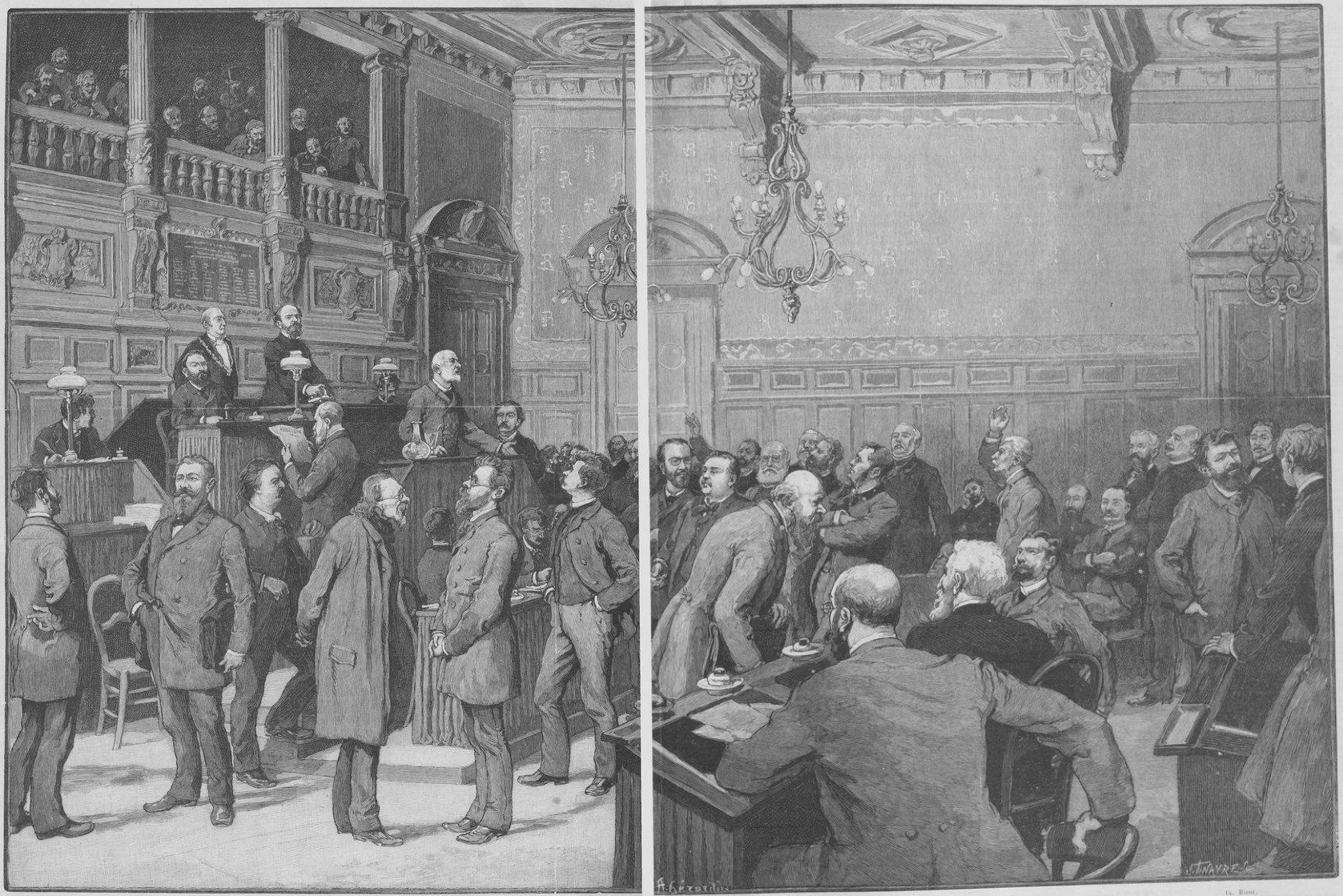
A meeting of the Paris Municipal Council (1889)

After the Commune took over the municipal government of Paris in March 1871, the French national government concluded that Paris was too important to be run by the Parisians alone. On 14 April 1871, just before the end of the Commune, the National Assembly, meeting in Versailles, passed a new law giving Paris a special status different from other French cities and subordinate to the national government. All male Parisians could vote. The city was given a municipal council of eighty members, four from each arrondissement, for a term of three years. The council could meet for four sessions a year, none longer than ten days, except when considering the budget, when six weeks were allowed. There was no elected mayor. The real powers in the city remained the Prefect of the Seine and the Prefect of Police, both appointed by the national government.

The first legislative elections after the Commune, on 7 January 1872, were won by the conservative candidates. Victor Hugo, running as an independent candidate on the side of the radical republicans, was soundly defeated. In the Paris municipal elections of 1878, however, the radical Republicans were overwhelmingly victorious, winning 75 of the 80 municipal council seats. In 1879, they changed the name of many of the Paris streets and squares. The "Place du Château-d’Eau" became the Place de la République, and a statue of the Republic was placed in the center in 1883. The avenues "de la Reine-Hortense" (named for the mother of Napoleon III, Hortense de Beauharnais), "Joséphine" (name for the wife of Napoleon I, Joséphine de Beauharnais), and "Roi-de-Rome" (named for Napoleon II), were renamed Avenue Hoche, Avenue Marceau, and Avenue Kléber, after generals who served during the period of the French Revolution: Lazare Hoche, François Séverin Marceau-Desgraviers, and Jean-Baptiste Kléber.

The burning of the Tuileries Palace by the Commune meant that there was no longer a residence for the French head of state. The Élysée Palace was chosen as the new residence in 1873. It was built between 1718 and 1722 by the architect Armand-Claude Mollet for Louis Henri de La Tour d'Auvergne, Count of Évreux, then purchased in 1753 by King Louis XV for his mistress, the Marquise de Pompadour. During the period of the French Consulate, it was owned by Joachim Murat, one of Napoleon's marshals. In 1805, Napoleon made it one of his imperial residences, and it became the official presidential residence when his nephew, Louis-Napoléon, the future Emperor Napoleon III, became President of the Second Republic. During the Bourbon Restoration of 1815–1830, the Élysée gardens were a popular amusement park. The Élysée Palace had no large room for ceremonial events, so a large ballroom was added during the Third Republic.

The most memorable Parisian civic event during the period was the funeral of Victor Hugo in 1885. Hundreds of thousands of Parisians lined the Champs-Élysées to see the passage of his coffin. The Arc de Triomphe was draped in black. The remains of the writer were placed in the Panthéon, formerly the Church of Saint-Geneviève, which had been turned into a mausoleum for great Frenchmen during the French Revolution, then turned back into a church in April 1816, during the Bourbon Restoration. After several changes during the 19th century, it was secularized again in 1885 for the occasion of Victor Hugo's funeral.

=== Social unrest, anarchists and the Boulanger crisis ===
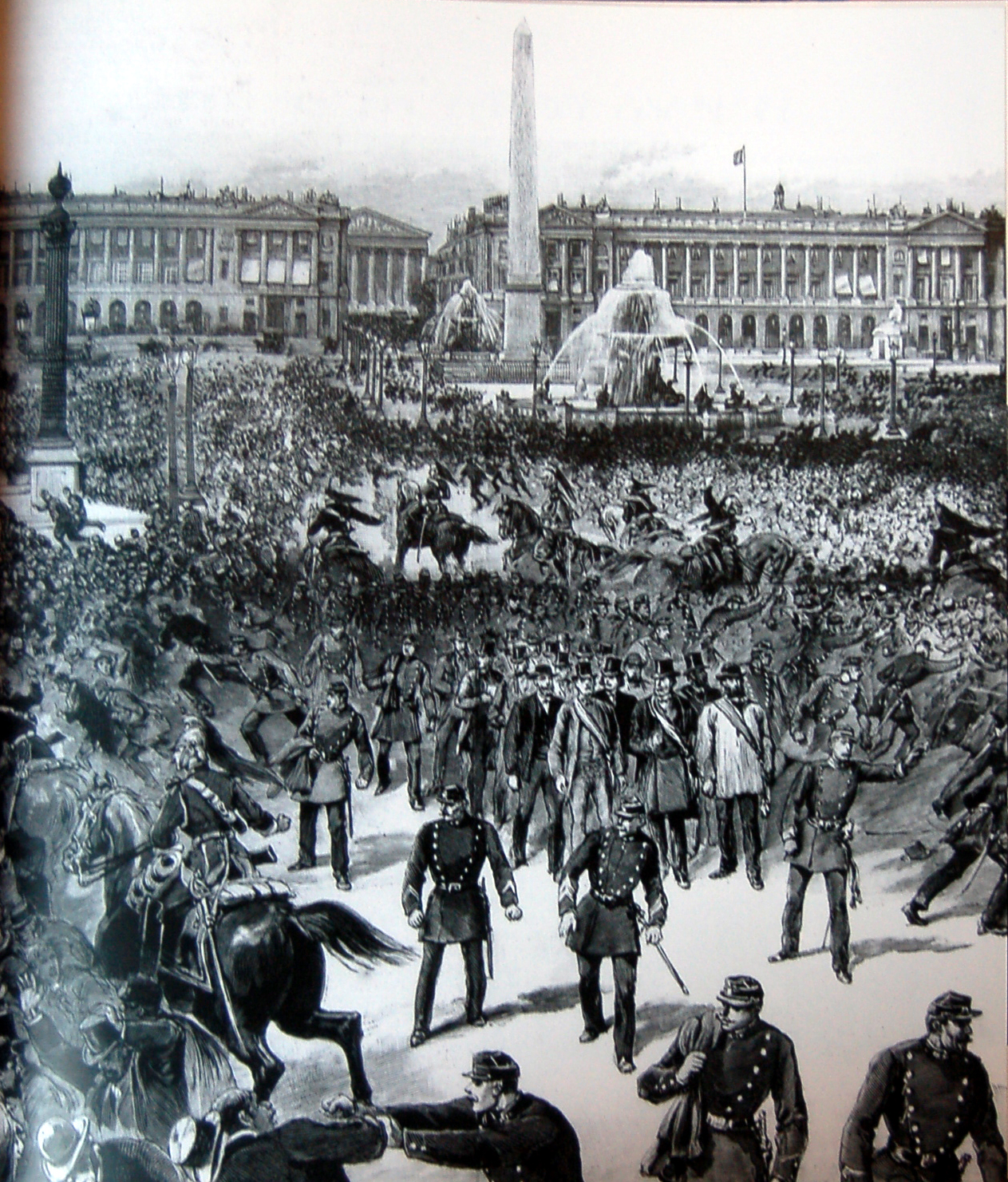
May Day battles between socialist workers and police on the Place de la Concorde (1890)

The Belle Époque was spared the violent uprisings that brought down two French regimes in the 19th century, but it had its share of political and social conflicts and occasional violence. Labor unions and strikes had been legalized during the regime of Napoleon III. The first labor union congress in Paris took place in October 1876, and the socialist party recruited many members among the Paris workers. On May 1, 1890, the socialists organized the first celebration of May Day, the international day of labor. Since it was an unauthorized celebration, it led to confrontations between police and demonstrators.

The majority of political violence came from the anarchist movement of the 1890s. The first attack was organized by an anarchist named Ravachol, who set off bombs at three residences of wealthy Parisians. On April 25, he set off a bomb at the Restaurant Véry at the Palais-Royal and was arrested. On 8 November, anarchists planted a bomb in the office of the Compagnie Minière et Métallurgique, a mining company, on the Avenue de l'Opéra. The police found the bomb, but when it was taken to the police headquarters, it exploded, killing six persons. On 6 December, an anarchist named Auguste Vaillant set off a bomb in the building of the National Assembly that wounded forty-six persons. On 12 February 1894, an anarchist named Émile Henry set off a bomb at the café of the Hôtel Terminus next to the Gare Saint-Lazare that killed one person and wounded seventy-nine.

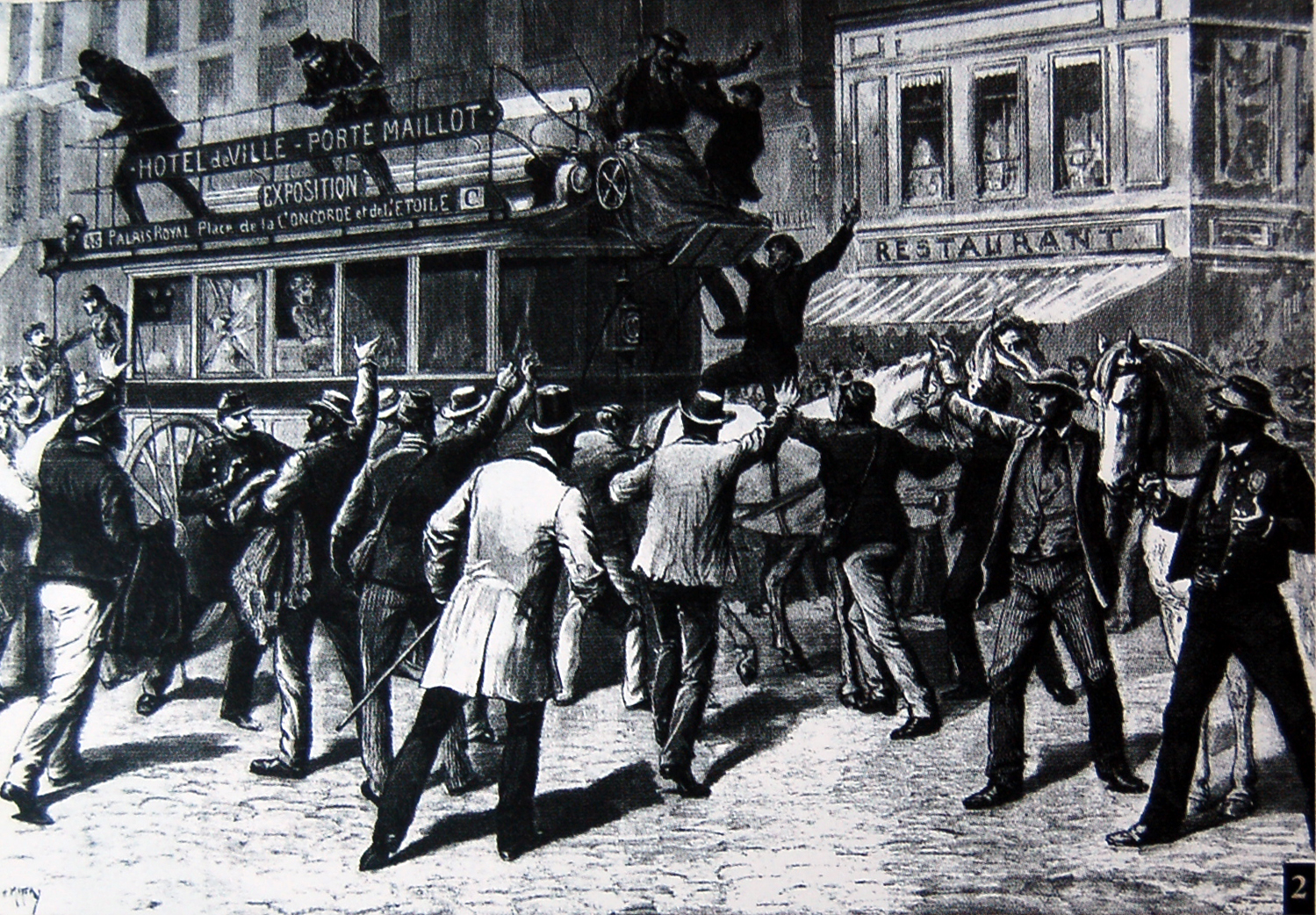
A transit strike in 1891

Another political crisis shook Paris beginning on 2 December 1887, when the president of the republic, Jules Grévy, was forced to resign when it was discovered that he had been selling the nation's highest award, the Legion of Honour. A popular general, Georges Ernest Boulanger, had his name put forward as a potential new leader. He became known as "the man on horseback" because of images of him on his black horse. He was supported by ardent nationalists who wanted a war with Germany to take back Alsace and Lorraine, which were lost in the 1870 Franco-Prussian War. Monarchist politicians began to promote Boulanger as a potential new leader who could dissolve the parliament, become president, recover the lost provinces and restore the French monarchy. Boulanger was elected to parliament in 1888, and his followers urged him to go to the Élysée Palace and declare himself president; but he refused, saying that he could win the office legally in a few months. However, the wave of enthusiasm for Boulanger quickly faded away, and he went into voluntary exile. The government of the Third Republic remained firmly in place.

=== The Police ===
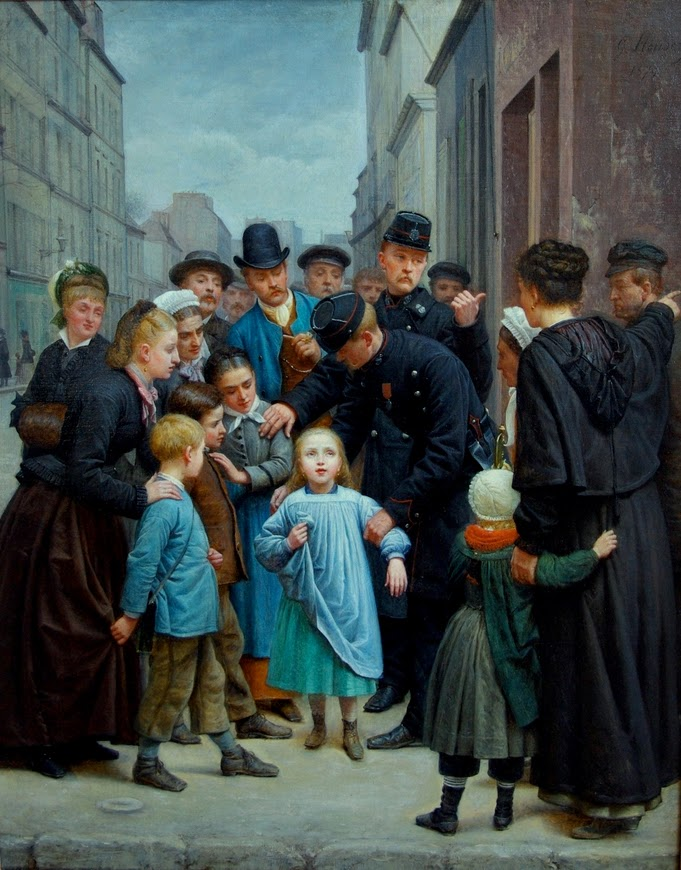
Policemen helping a lost little girl in the painting La petite fille perdue dans Paris by Charles-Gustave Housez (1877)

The Paris police force was completely re-organized after the fall of Napoleon III and the Commune; the sergents de ville were replaced by the gardiens de la paix publique (Guardians of the Public Peace), which by June 1871 had 7,756 men under the authority of the Prefect of Police named by the national government. Following a series of anarchist bombings in 1892, the number was increased to 7,000 guardians, 80 brigadiers and 950 sous-brigadiers. In 1901, under the prefect Louis Lépine, in order to keep up with the technology of the time, a unit of policemen on bicycles (called the hirondelles after the brand of the bicycles) was formed. They numbered 18 per arrondissement and reached 600 by 1906 for the whole city. A unit of river police, the brigade fluviale, was organized in 1900 for the Universal Exposition, as well as a unit of traffic police who wore a symbol of a Roman chariot embroidered on the sleeve of their uniform. The first six motorcycle policemen appeared on the streets in 1906.

In addition to the gardiens de la paix publique, Paris was guarded by the Garde républicaine under the military command of the Gendarmerie Nationale. Gendarmes had been a particular target of the Commune; 33 had been taken hostages and were executed by a (Communard) firing squad on Rue Haxo on 23 May 1871 in the last days of the Commune. In June 1871, they provided security in the damaged city. They numbered 6,500 men in two regiments, plus a unit of cavalry and a dozen cannon. The number was reduced in 1873 to 4,000 men in a single regiment, called the Légion de la Garde républicaine (Legion of the Republican Guard), with its headquarters on the Quai de Bourbon and troops quartered in several barracks around the city. The Republican Guard was given the duty of providing security for the president of the republic at the Élysée Palace, the National Assembly and the Senate, at the prefecture of police, and also at the Opéra, theaters, public balls, racetracks, and other public places. A unit of bicyclists was formed on 6 June 1907. When World War I began, the entire unit of Paris gendarmes was mobilized and fought at the front during war; 222 of them lost their lives.

By a decree of 29 June 1912, to assure the security of Paris by fighting organized criminals such as the Apaches and the bande à Bonnot, a criminal section called the Brigade criminelle was created.

== Religion ==
Paris in the Belle Époque witnessed a long and sometimes bitter dispute between the Catholic Church and governments of the Third Republic. During the Commune, the Church was particularly targeted for attack; 24 priests and the Archbishop of Paris were taken hostages and shot by firing squads in the final days of the Commune. The new government after 1871 was conservative and Catholic, and provided substantial funding for the Church establishment through the Ministère des Cultes, which approved the building of the Basilica of Sacré-Cœur on Montmartre without government funds as an act of expiation for the events of 1870–1871. The anti-clerical Republicans took power in 1879, and one of their leaders, Jules Ferry, declared: "My objective is to organize humanity without God and without kings." In March 1880, the Assembly outlawed religious congregations not authorized by the State, and on 30 June had the police expel the Jesuits from their building at 33 Rue de Sèvres. 260 monasteries and convents were closed in Paris and the rest of France. A new law was passed declaring that all public education should be non-religious (laïque) and obligatory. In 1883, new laws were passed to forbid public prayers and forbid soldiers to attend religious services in uniform. In 1881, twenty-seven cadets from the École spéciale militaire de Saint-Cyr (Military Academy of Saint-Cyr) were expelled for attending a mass at the church of Saint-Germain-des-Prés. The law against working on Sunday was repealed in 1880 (it was reinstated in 1906 to assure workers a day of rest), and in 1885, divorce was authorized.

The new Municipal Council of Paris, also dominated by radical republicans, had little formal power, but it took many symbolic measures against the Church. Nuns and other religious figures were forbidden to have official positions in hospitals, statues were put up to honor Voltaire and Diderot, and the Panthéon was secularized in 1885 to receive the remains of Victor Hugo. Several of the streets of Paris were renamed for republican and socialist heroes, including Auguste Comte (1885), François-Vincent Raspail (1887), Armand Barbès (1882), and Louis Blanc (1885). Specifically forbidden by the Catholic Church, cremation was authorized at Père Lachaise Cemetery. In 1899, the Dreyfus affair divided Parisians (and the whole of France) even more; the Catholic newspaper La Croix published virulent anti-Semitic articles against the army officer.

The new National Assembly of 1901 had a strongly anti-clerical majority. At the urging of the socialist members, the Assembly officially voted the separation of Church and State on 9 December 1905. The budget of 35 million francs a year given to the Church was cut off, and disputes took place over the official residences of the clergy. On December 17, the police evicted the Archbishop of Paris from his official residence at 127 Rue de Grenelle; the Church responded by banning midnight masses in the city. A law of 1907 finally resolved the issue of property; churches built before that date, including the cathedral of Notre Dame, became the property of the French state, while the Catholic Church was given the right to use them for religious purposes. Despite the cutoff of government assistance, the Catholic Church was able to build 24 new churches, including 15 in the suburbs of Paris, between 1906 and 1914. Official relations between Church and State were almost non-existent to the end of the Belle Époque.

The Jewish community in Paris had grown from 500 in 1789, or one percent of the Jewish community in France, to 30,000 in 1869, or 40 percent. Beginning in 1881, there were new waves of immigration from Eastern Europe that brought 7 to 9,000 new arrivals each year, and French-born Jews in the 3rd and 4th arrondissements were soon outnumbered by new arrivals, whose numbers increased from 16 percent of the population in those arrondissements to 61 percent. The pogroms in the Russian Empire between 1905 and 1914 provoked a new wave of immigrants arriving in Paris. The community faced a strong current of antisemitism, exemplified by the Dreyfus Affair. With the arrival of the great number of Ashkenazi Jews from Eastern Europe and Russia, the Paris community became more and more secular and less religious.

There was no mosque in Paris until after the First World War. In 1920, the National Assembly voted to honor the memory of the estimated one hundred thousand Muslims from the French colonies in the Maghreb and black Africa who died for France during the war, and gave a credit of 500,000 francs to build the Grand Mosque of Paris.

== The economy ==
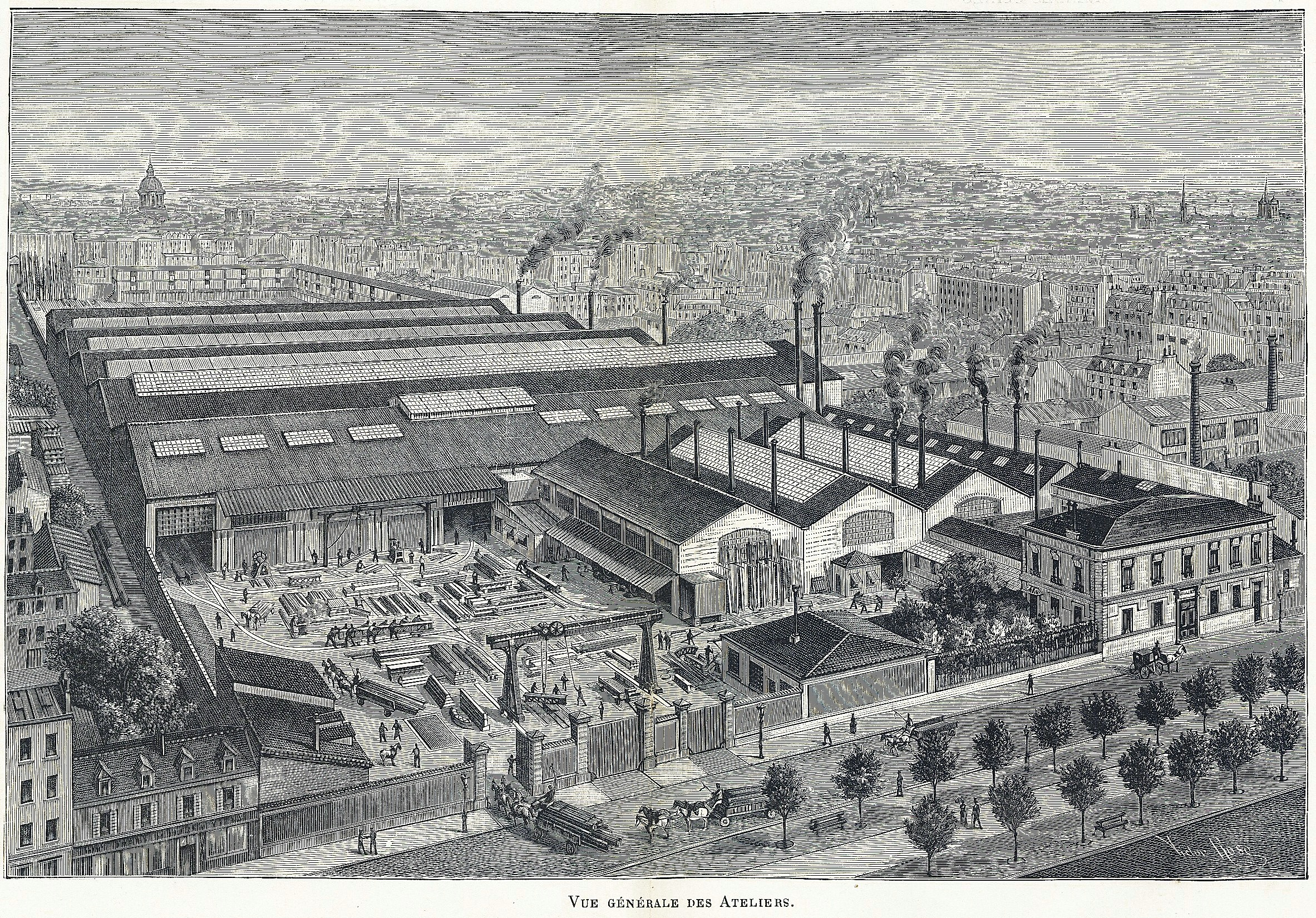
The Moisant workshop on the Boulevard de Vaugirard (1889) made the metal structure for the Bon Marché department store

The economy of Paris suffered an economic crisis in the early 1870s, followed by a long, slow recovery that led to a period of rapid growth beginning in 1895 until the First World War. Between 1872 and 1895, 139 large enterprises closed their doors in Paris, particularly textile and furniture factories, metallurgy concerns, and printing houses, four industries had been the major employers in the city for sixty years. Most of these enterprises had employed between 100 and 200 workers each. Half of the large enterprises on the center of the city's Right Bank moved out, in part because of the high cost of real estate, and also to get better access to transportation on the river and railroads. Several moved to less-expensive areas at the edges of the city, around Montparnasse and La Salpêtriére, while others went to the 18th arrondissement, La Villette and the Canal Saint-Denis to be closer to the river ports and the new railroad freight yards. Still others relocated to Picpus and Charonne in the southeast, or near Grenelle and Javel in the southwest. The total number of enterprises in Paris dropped from 76,000 in 1872 to 60,000 in 1896, while in the suburbs their number grew from 11,000 to 13,000. In the heart of Paris, many workers were still employed in traditional industries such as textiles (18,000 workers), garment production (45,000 workers), and in new industries which required highly skilled workers, such as mechanical and electrical engineering and automobile manufacturing.

== Cars, airplanes and movies ==
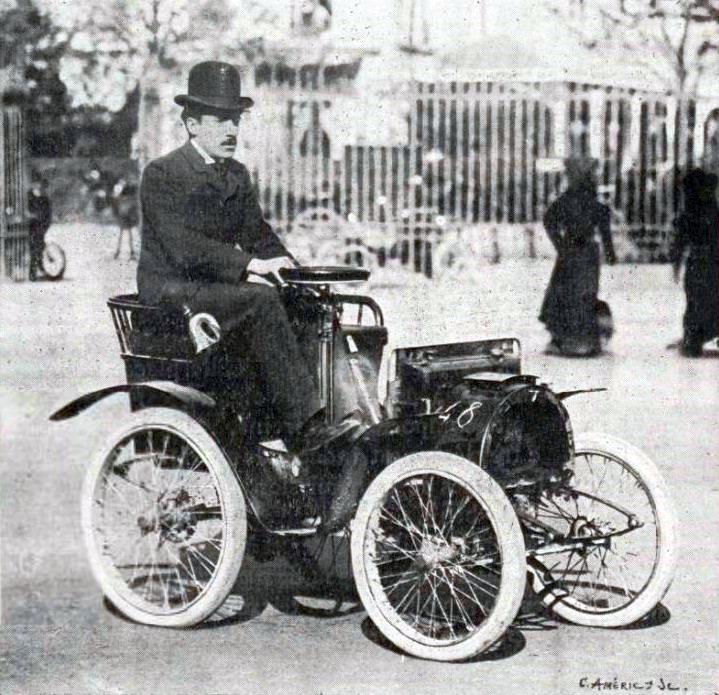
Louis Renault and his first car (1903)

Three major new French industries were born in and around Paris at about the turn of the 20th century, taking advantage of the abundance of skilled engineers and technicians and financing from Paris banks. They produced the first French automobiles, aircraft, and motion pictures. In 1898, Louis Renault and his brother Marcel built their first automobile and founded a new company to produce them. They established their first factory at Boulogne-Billancourt, just outside the city, and made the first French truck in 1906. In 1908, they built 3,595 cars, making them the largest car manufacturer in France. They also received an important contract to make taxicabs for the largest Paris taxi company. When the first World War began in 1914, the Renault taxis of Paris were mobilized to carry French soldiers to the front at the First Battle of the Marne.

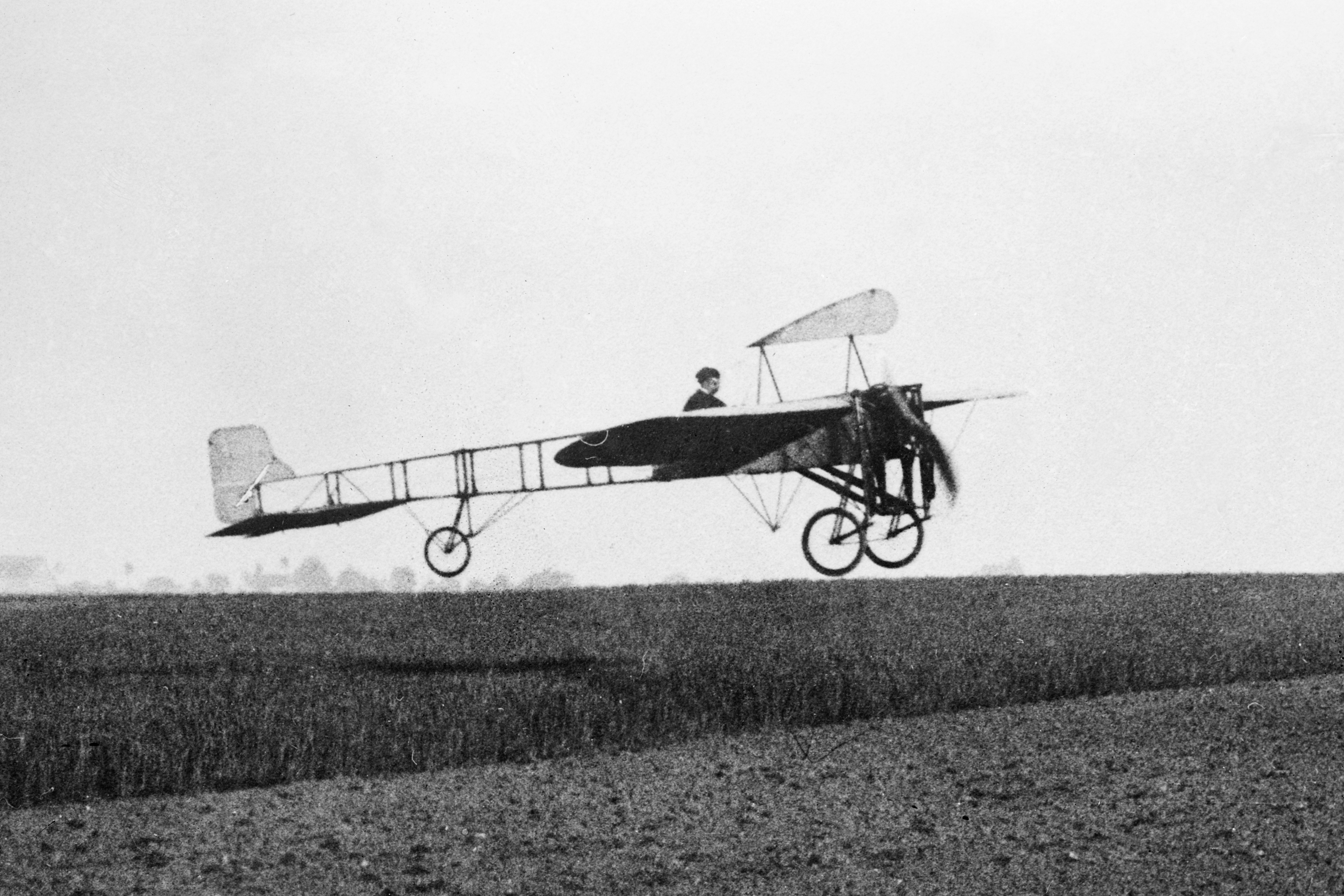
Louis Blériot and his aircraft (1909)

The French aviation pioneer Louis Blériot also established a company, Blériot Aéronautique, on the Boulevard Victor-Hugo in Neuilly, where he manufactured the first French airplanes. On 25 July 1909, he became the first man to fly across the English Channel. Blériot moved his company to Buc, near Versailles, where he established a private airport and a flying school. In 1910, he built the Aérobus, one of the first passenger aircraft, which could carry seven persons, the most of any aircraft of the time.

The Lumière brothers had given the first projected showing of a motion picture, La Sortie de l'usine Lumière, at the Salon Indien du Grand Café of the Hôtel Scribe on the Boulevard des Capucines, on 28 December 1895. A young French entrepreneur, Georges Méliès, attended the first showing and asked the Lumière brothers for a license to make films. The Lumière Brothers politely declined, telling him that the cinema was for scientific purposes and had no commercial value. Méliès persisted and established his own small studio in 1897 in Montreuil, just east of Paris. He became a producer, director, scenarist, set designer and actor, and made hundreds of short films, including the first science-fiction film, A Trip to the Moon (Le Voyage dans la Lune), in 1902. Another French cinema pioneer and producer Charles Pathé, also built a studio in Montreuil, then moved to the Rue des Vignerons in Vincennes, east of Paris. His chief rival in the early French film industry, Léon Gaumont, opened his first studio at about the same time at the Rue des Alouettes in the 19th arrondissement, near the Buttes-Chaumont.

== Commerce and the department stores ==
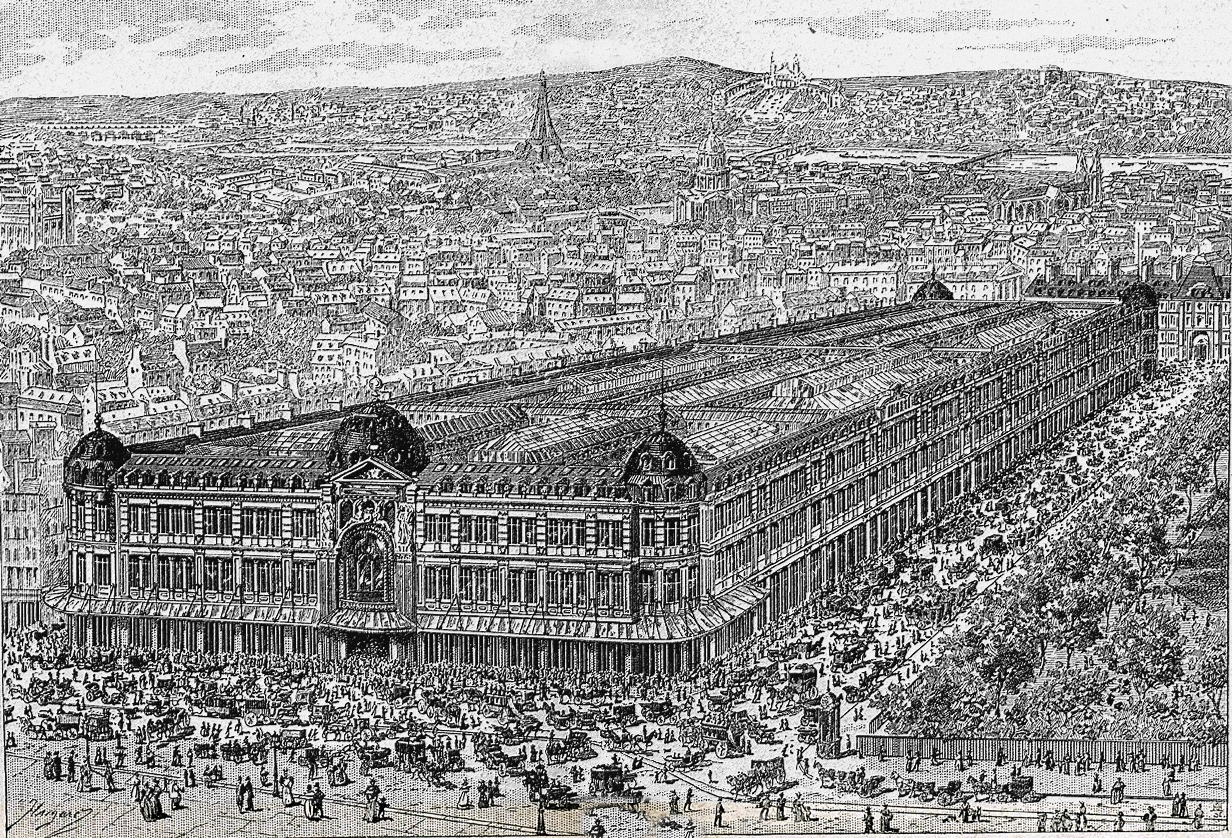
Le Bon Marché in 1887

The Belle Époque in Paris was the golden age of the Grand magasin, or department store. The first modern department store in the city, Le Bon Marché, was originally a small variety store with a staff of twelve when it was taken over by Aristide Boucicaut in 1852. Boucicaut expanded it, and by deft discount pricing, advertising, and innovative marketing (a mail order catalog, seasonal sales, fashion shows, gifts to customers, entertainment for children) turned it into a hugely successful enterprise with a staff of eleven hundred employees and income that increased from 5 million francs in 1860 to 20 million in 1870, then reached 72 million at the time of his death in 1877. He built an enormous new building near the site of the original shop on the Left Bank, with an iron structure designed with the help of the engineering firm of Gustave Eiffel.

The success of Bon Marché inspired many competitors. The Grands Magasins du Louvre opened in 1855 with an income of 5 million francs that rose to 41 million by 1875 and 2400 employees in 1882. The Bazar de l'Hôtel de Ville (BHV) opened in 1857 and moved into a larger store in 1866. Printemps was founded in 1865 by a former department head of Bon Marché; La Samaritaine was opened in 1870; and La Ville de Saint-Denis, the first building in France to have an elevator, in 1869. Alphonse Kahn opened his Galeries Lafayette in 1895.

== High fashion and luxury goods ==
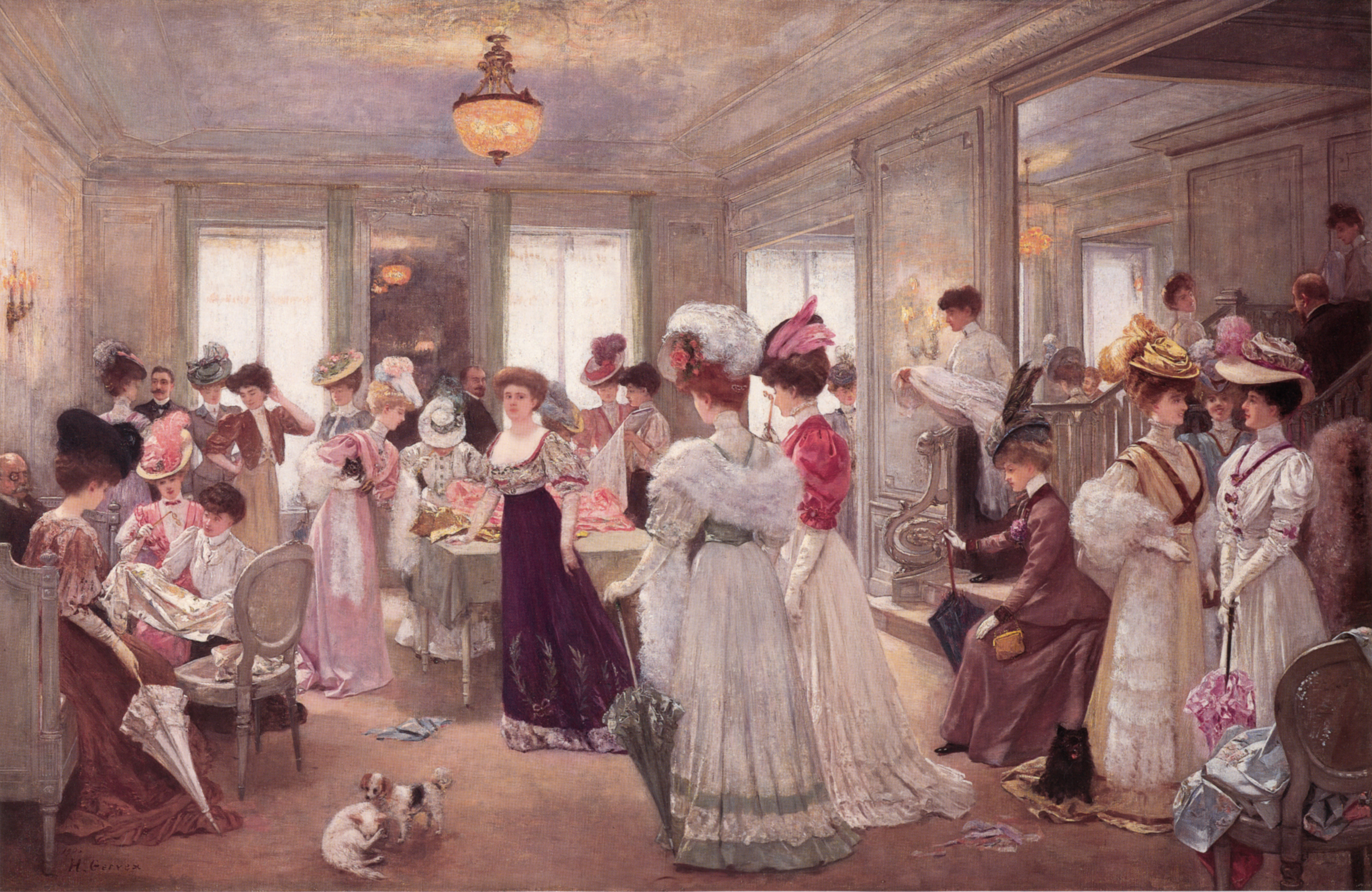
Jeanne Paquin's fashion house (1906)

At the beginning of the Belle Époque, the industry of haute couture (high fashion) was dominated by the House of Worth. Charles Worth had designed the clothes of the Empress Eugénie during the Second Empire and turned high fashion into an industry. His shop at 7 Rue de la Paix helped make that street the center of fashion in Paris. By 1900, there were more than twenty houses of haute couture in Paris, led by designers including Jeanne Paquin, Paul Poiret, Georges Doeuillet, Margaine-Lacroix, Redfern, Raudnitz, Rouff, Callot Sœurs, Blanche Lebouvier, and others, including sons of Charles Worth. Most of these houses had fewer than fifty employees, but the top six or seven firms each had between four hundred and nine hundred employees. They were concentrated on Rue de la Paix and around the Place Vendôme, with a few on the nearby Grands Boulevards. At the Universal Exposition of 1900, an entire building was devoted to fashion designers. The first fashion show with models had taken place in London in 1908; the idea was quickly copied in Paris. Jeanne Lanvin became a member of the Chambre syndicale de la haute couture (syndicate of fashion designers) in 1909. Coco Chanel opened her first shop in Paris in 1910, but her fame as a designer came after the First World War.

The growth of the department stores and tourism created a much larger market for luxury goods, such as perfumes, watches and jewelry. The perfumer François Coty began making scents in 1904, and achieved his first success selling through department stores. He discovered the importance of elegant bottles in marketing perfume and commissioned Baccarat and René Lalique to design bottles in the Art Nouveau style. He realized the desire of middle class consumers to have luxury goods and sold a range of less-expensive perfumes. He also invented the fragrance set, a box of perfume, powder soap, cream and cosmetics with the same scent. He was so successful that in 1908 he built a new laboratory and factory, La Cité des Parfums ("The City of Perfume"), at Suresnes in the Paris suburbs. It had 9,000 employees and made one hundred thousand bottles of perfume a day.

The watchmaker Louis-François Cartier opened a shop in Paris in 1847. In 1899, his grandchildren moved the shop to the Rue de la Paix and made the shop international, opening branches in London (1902), Moscow (1908) and New York (1909). His grandson Louis Cartier designed one of the first purpose-built wristwatches for the Brazilian aviation pioneer Alberto Santos-Dumont, who made the first aircraft flight in Paris in 1906. The "Santos watch" went on sale in 1911 and was a huge success for the company.

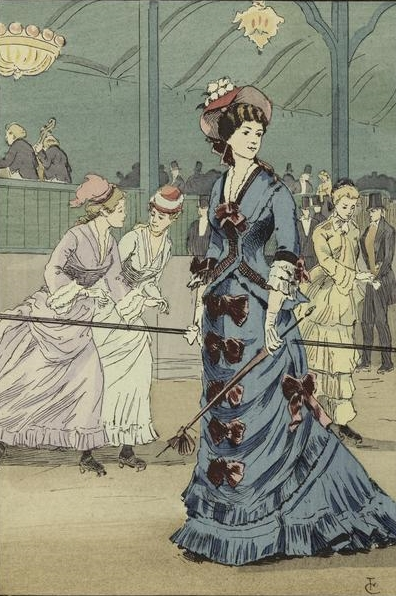
A costume for roller skating at the Bal Bullier (1876)

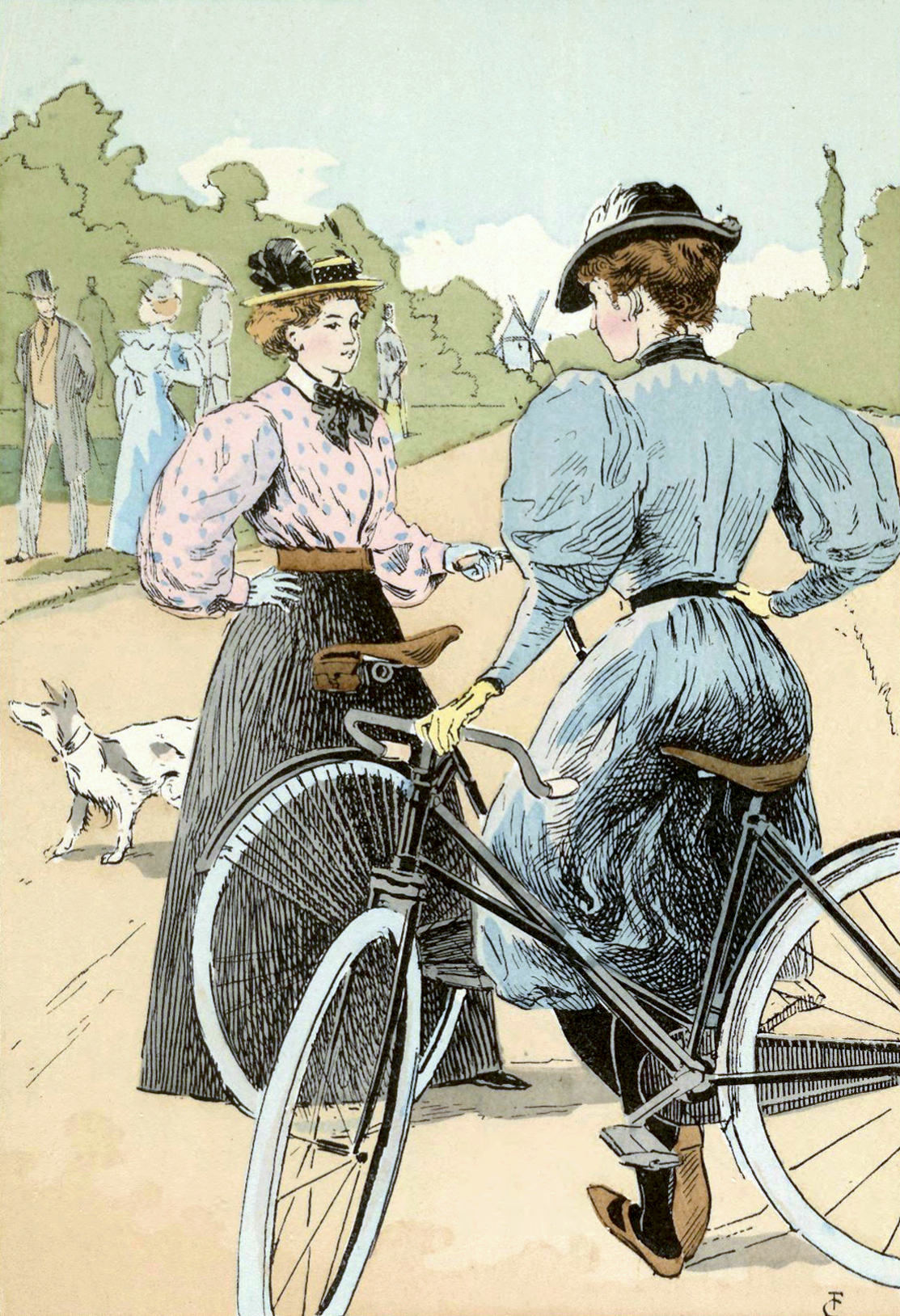
Bicycling costumes (1898)

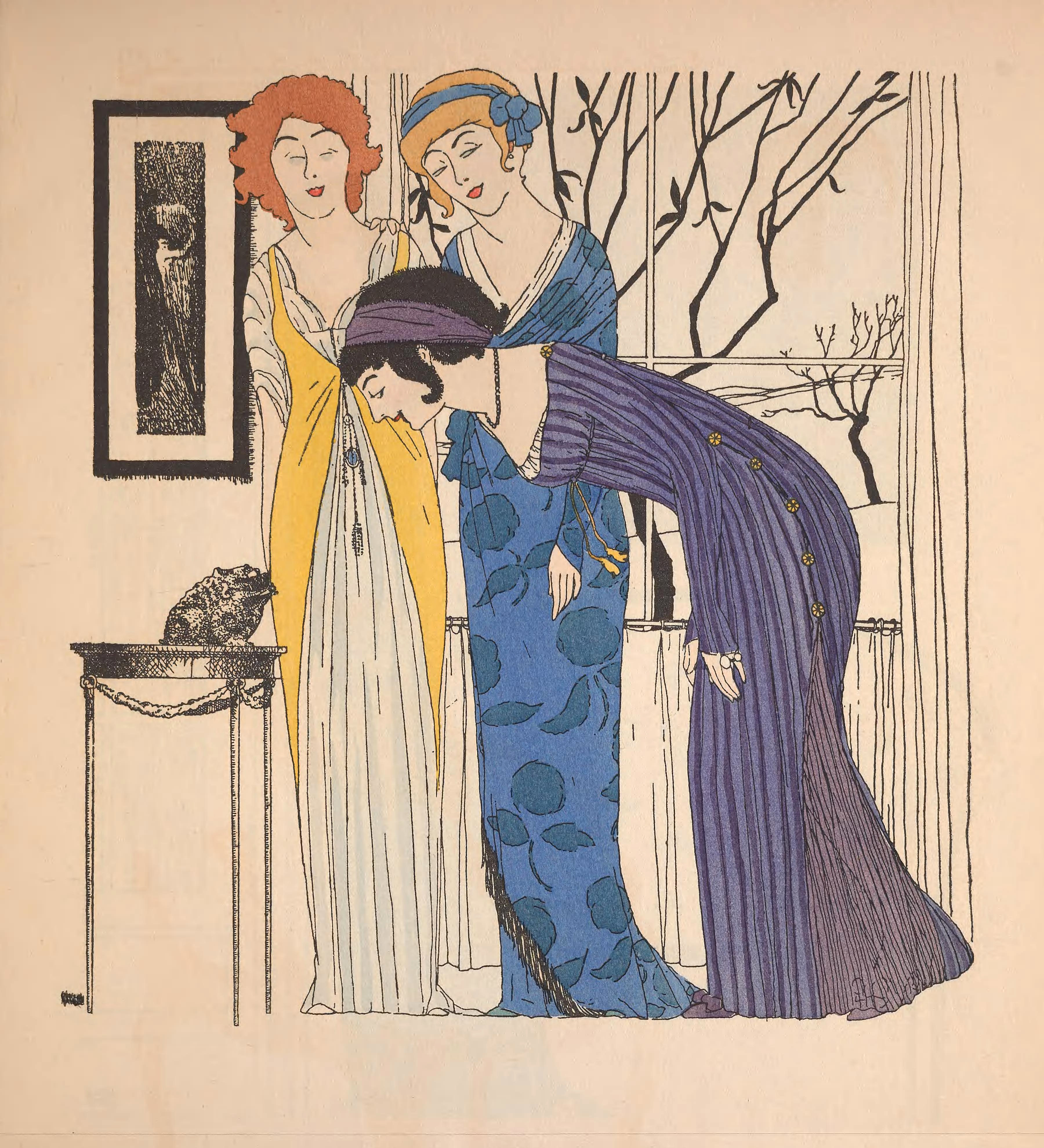
Designs by Paul Poiret (1908)

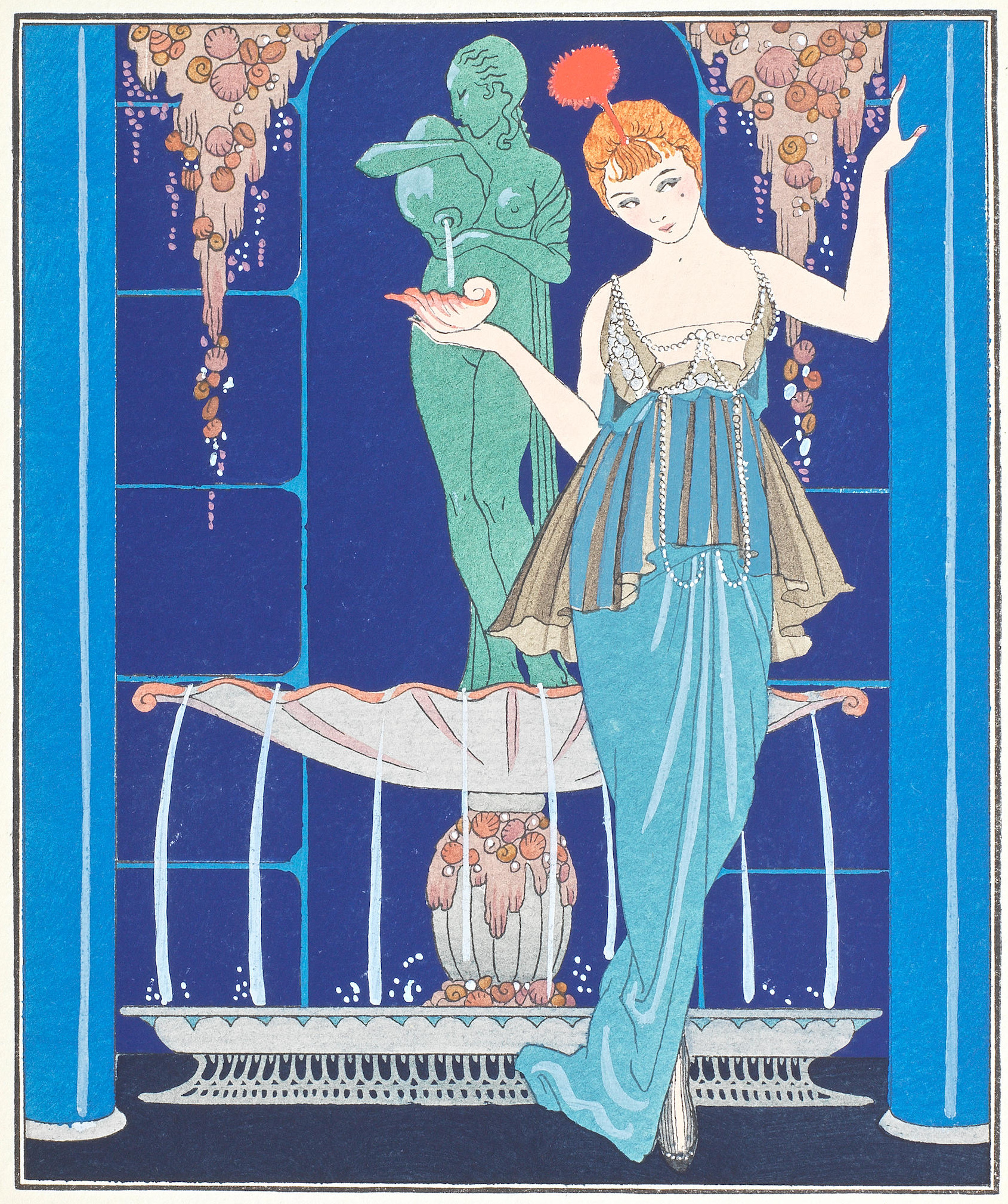
An evening theater dress by Jeanne Paquin (1914)

== Tourism, hotels and railroad stations ==
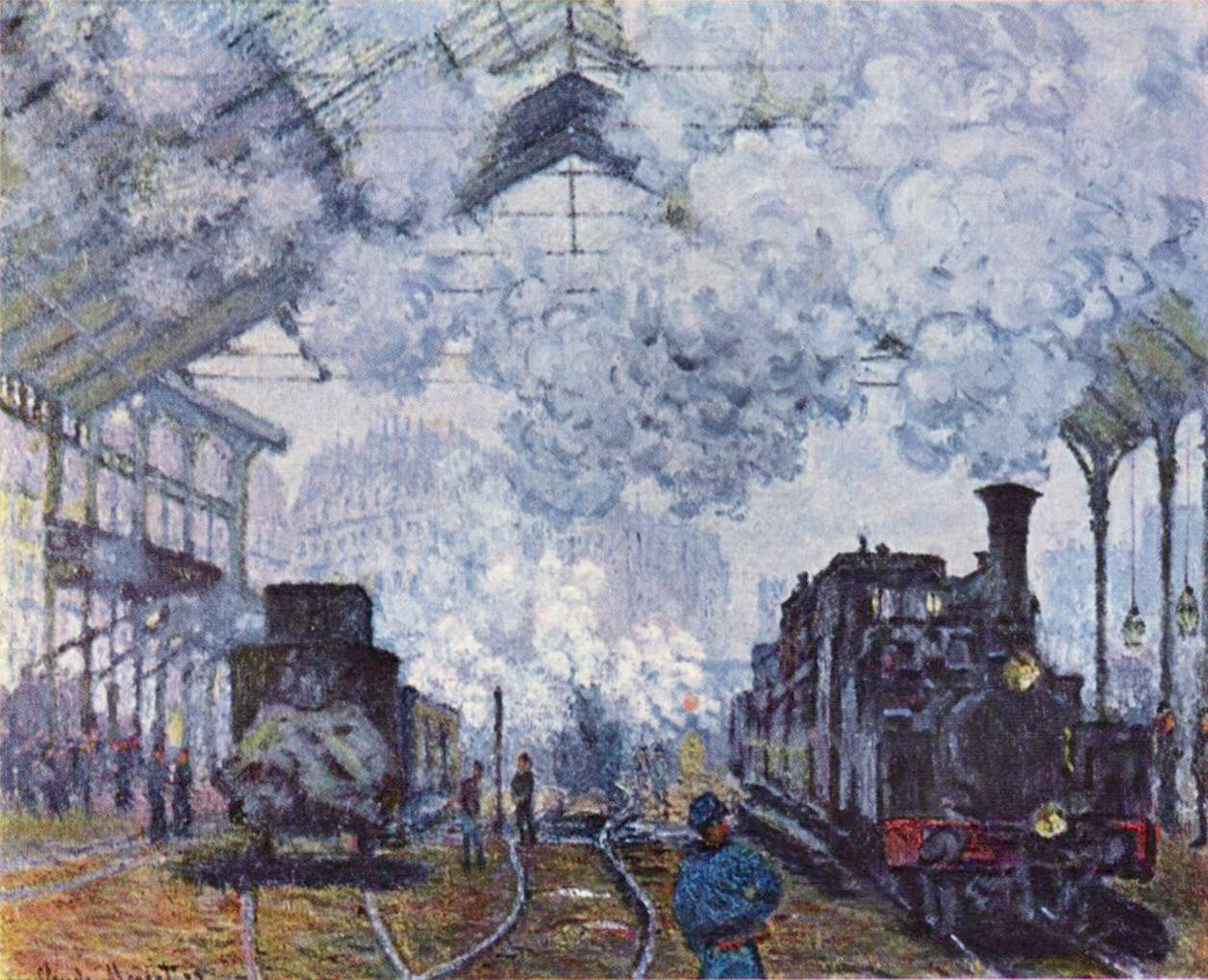
Claude Monet: Gare Saint-Lazare, l'arrivée d'un train, 1877, Fogg Art Museum, USA

The industry of mass tourism and large luxury hotels had arrived in Paris under Napoleon III, driven by new railroads and the huge crowds that had come for the first international expositions. The expositions and the crowds grew even larger during the Belle Époque; twenty-three million visitors came to Paris for the 1889 exposition, and the 1900 exposition welcomed forty-eight million visitors. The Grand Hôtel du Louvre, built for the universal exposition of 1855, opened that same year. The Grand Hôtel on the Boulevard des Capucines opened in 1862. More luxury hotels appeared near the train stations and in the city center during the Belle Époque; the Hôtel Continental opened in 1878 on the Rue de Rivoli on the site of the old Ministry of Finance, which had been burned by the Paris Commune. The Hôtel Ritz on the Place Vendôme opened in 1898, and the Hôtel de Crillon on the Place de la Concorde opened in 1909.

The growing number of visitors to Paris required the enlargement of the main train stations to handle all the passengers. The Gare Saint-Lazare had been covered with a forty-meter high shed between 1851 and 1853; it was further enlarged for the 1889 exposition, and a new hotel, the Terminus, was built next to it. The station and its huge shed became a popular subject for painters, among them Claude Monet, during the period. A brand-new station, the Gare d'Orsay, designed by Victor Laloux, opened on 4 July 1900; it was the first station designed for electrified trains. The line was not profitable, and the station was almost demolished in 1971, but between 1980 and 1986 it was turned into the Musée d'Orsay. The Gare Montparnasse, serving western France, had been built between 1848 and 1852. It was also enlarged between 1898 and 1900 to serve the growing number of passengers. The Gare de l'Est and Gare du Nord were both expanded, and the Gare de Lyon was completely rebuilt between 1895 and 1902 and given a new restaurant in the ornate style of the period, Le buffet de la Gare de Lyon, renamed the Train Bleu in 1963.

== From the fiacre to the taxicab ==
In the first part of the Belle Époque, the fiacre was the most common form of public transport for individuals; it was a box-line small horse-drawn coach with driver carrying two passengers that could be hired by the hour or by the distance of the trip. In 1900, there were about ten thousand fiacres in service in Paris; half belonged to a single company, the Compagnie générale des voitures de Paris; the other five thousand belonged to about five hundred small companies. The first two automobile taxis entered service in 1898, at a time when there were just 1,309 automobiles in Paris. The number remained very small at first; there were just eighteen in service during the Exposition of 1900, only eight in 1904, and 39 in 1905. However, by the end of 1905, the automobile taxi began to take off; there were 417 on the streets of Paris in 1906, and 1,465 at the end of 1907. Most were made by the Renault company in their factory on the Île Seguin, an island on the Seine between Boulogne-Billancourt and Sèvres. There were four large taxi companies; the largest, the Compagnie française des automobiles de place owned more than a thousand taxis. Beginning 1898, the automobile taxis were equipped with a meter to measure the distance and calculate the fare. First called a taxamètre, it was renamed taximètre on 17 October 1904, which gave birth to the name "taxi". In 1907, Renault began building three thousand specially built taxis; some were exported to London and others to New York City. The ones that went into service in New York were named "taxi cabriolets", which was shortened in America to "taxicab". By 1913, there were seven thousand taxis on the streets of Paris.

== The omnibus, the tramway and the metro ==
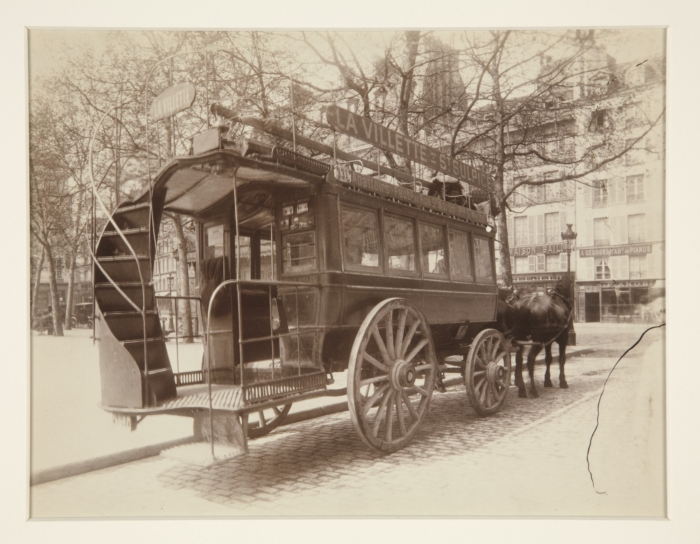
A horse-drawn Paris omnibus in 1910

At the beginning of the Belle Époque, the horse-drawn omnibus was the primary means of public transport. In 1855, Haussmann consolidated ten private omnibus companies into a single company, the C.G.O. (Compagnie générale des Omnibus) and gave it the monopoly on public transport. The coaches of the CGO carried twenty-four to twenty-six passengers and ran on thirty-one different lines. The omnibus system was overwhelmed by the number of visitors at the 1867 Exposition, thus the city began to develop a new system of tramways in 1873. The omnibus continued to run, with larger cars that could carry forty passengers in 1880, and then, in 1888–89, a lighter vehicle that could carry thirty passengers, called an omnibus à impériale. The horse-drawn tramway gradually replaced the horse-drawn omnibus. In 1906, the first motorized omnibuses began to run on Paris streets. The last horse-drawn omnibus run took place on January 11, 1913 between Saint-Sulpice and La Villette.

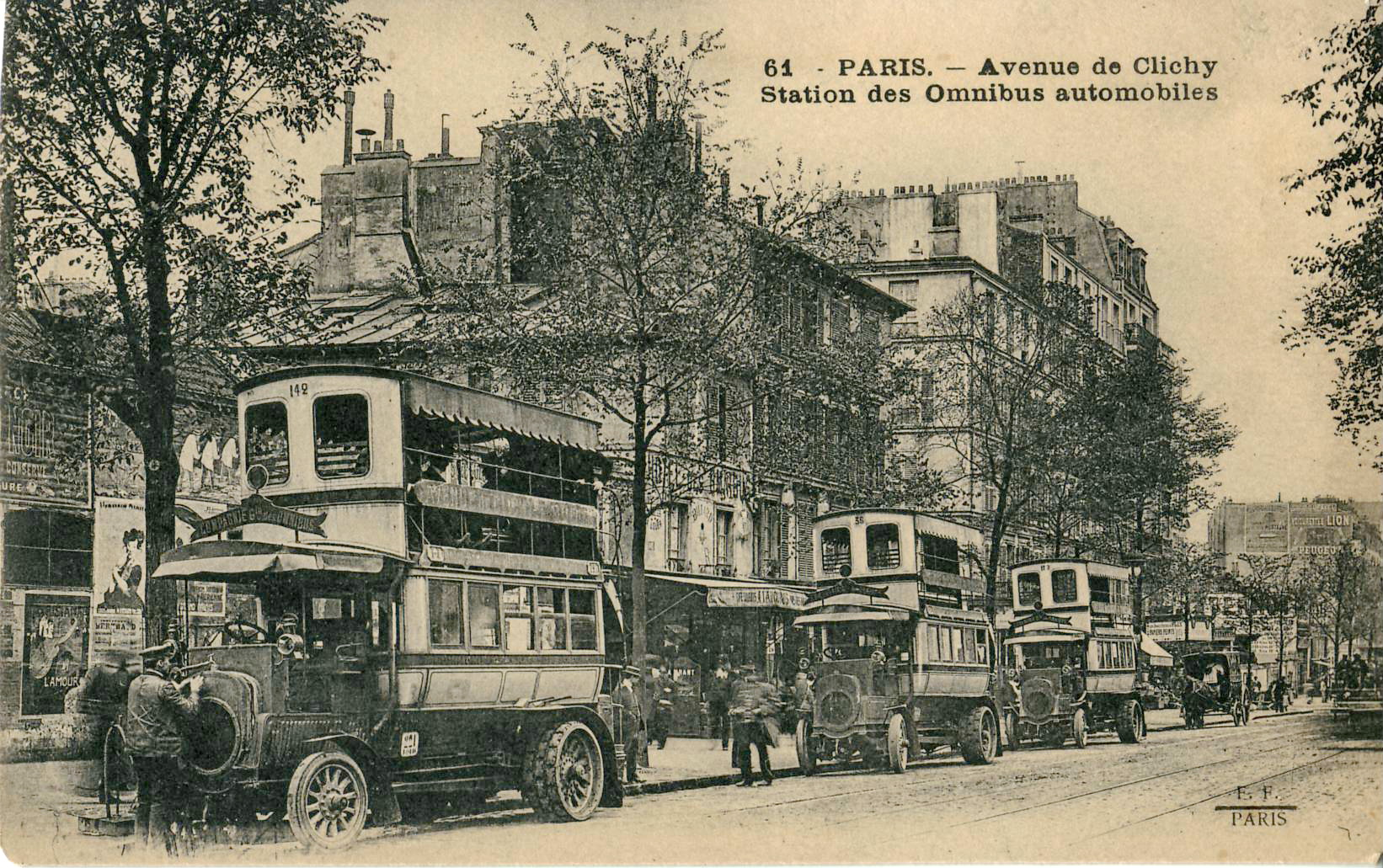
Motorized omnibuses on the Avenue de Clichy (1914)

The horse-drawn tramway, running on a track flush with the street, had been introduced in New York in 1832. A French engineer living in New York, Loubat, brought the idea to Paris and opened the first tramway line in Paris, between the Place de la Concorde and the Barrière de Passy in November 1853. He extended the line, known as the Chemin de fer américain ("American rail line"), all the way across Paris from Boulogne to Vincennes in 1856. But then it was purchased by the CGO, the main omnibus line, and remained simply a curiosity. Only in 1873 did the tramway begin to gain importance, when the CGO lost its monopoly on city transport and two new companies, Tramways Nord and Tramways Sud, one financed by Belgian banks and the other by British banks, began operating from the center of Paris to the suburbs. The CGO responded by opening two new lines, one from the Louvre to Vincennes, the other following the line of fortifications around the city. By 1878, forty different lines were operating, half by the CGO. The companies tried a brief experiment with steam-powered tramways in 1876, but abandoned them in 1878. The electric-powered tramway, in service in Berlin since 1881, did not arrive in Paris until 1898, with a line from Saint-Denis to the Madeleine.

When the 1900 Universal Exposition was announced in 1898 in anticipation of millions of visitors coming to Paris, most of the public transport in Paris was still horse-drawn; forty-eight lines of omnibuses and thirty-four tramway lines still used horses, while there were just thirty-six lines of electric tramways. The last horse-drawn tramways were replaced with electric trams in 1914.

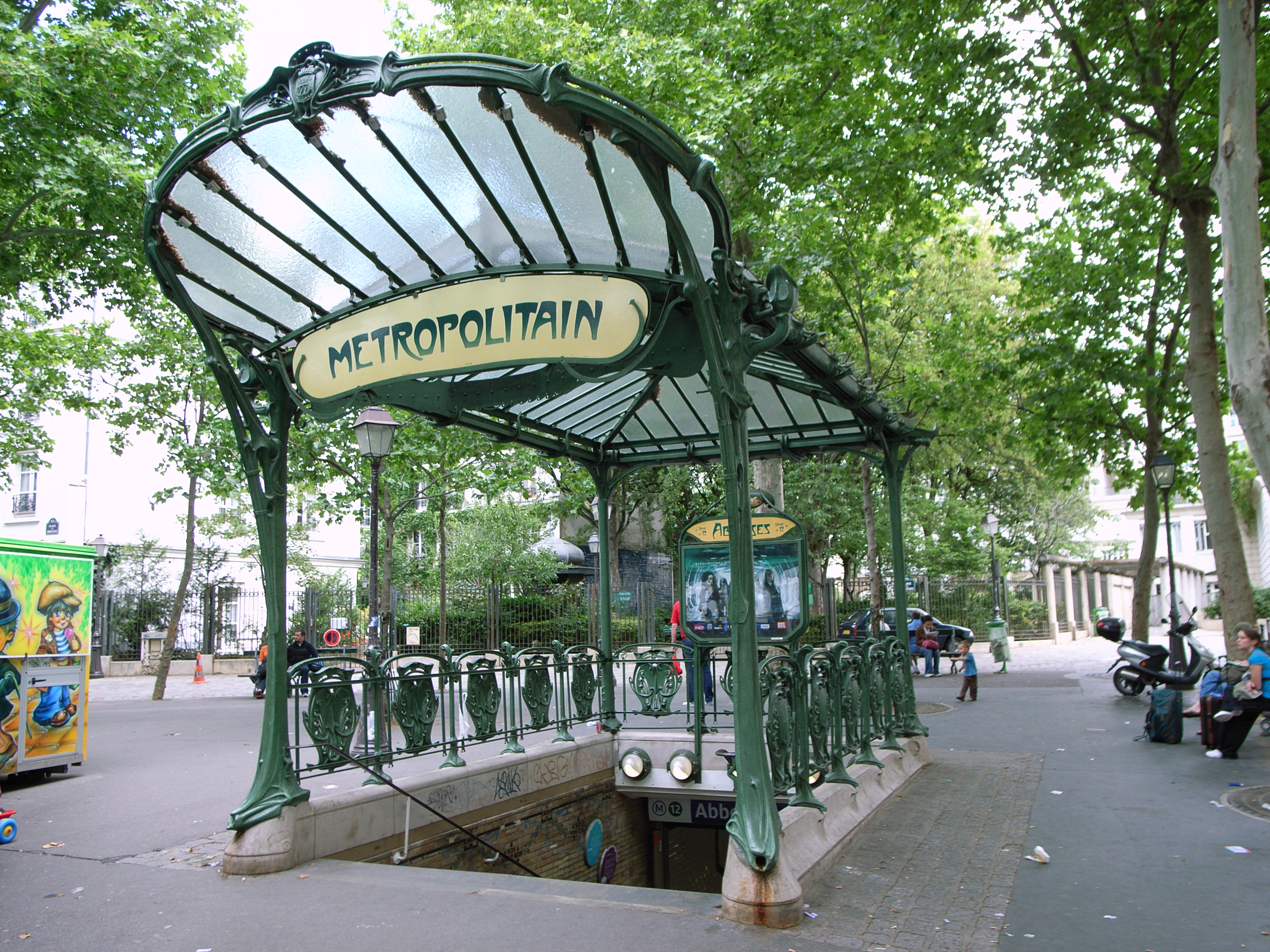
Hector Guimard's original Art Nouveau entrance to the Abbesses Métro station

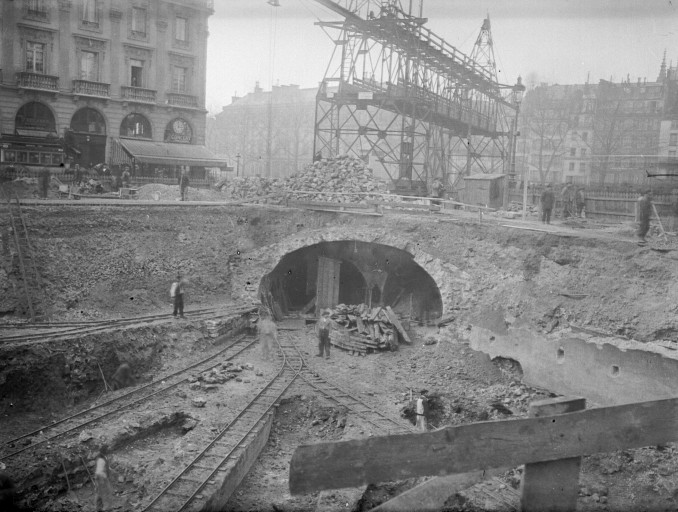
The Paris Métro under construction (between 1902 and 1910)

Other cities were well ahead of Paris in introducing underground or elevated metropolitan railways: London (1863), New York (1868), Berlin (1878), Chicago (1892), Budapest (1896) and Vienna (1898) all had them before Paris. The reason for the delay was a fierce battle between the French railway companies and national government, which wanted a metropolitan system based on the existing railroad stations that would bring passengers in from the suburbs (like the modern RER). The Municipal Council of Paris, in contrast, wanted an independent underground metro only in the twenty arrondissements of the city that would support the tramways and omnibuses on the streets. The plan of the municipality won and was approved on 30 March 1898; it called for six lines totaling sixty-five kilometers of track. They chose the Belgian method of construction, with the lines just under the surface of the street, rather than the deep tunnels of the London system.

The first line, which connected the Porte de Vincennes with the Grand Palais and the other exposition sites, was built the most rapidly (just twenty months) and opened on 19 July 1900, three months after the opening the exposition. It carried more than sixteen million passengers between July and December. Line 2, between Porte Dauphine and Nation, opened in April 1903, and the modern Line 6 was finished at the end of 1905. The earliest lines used viaducts to cross over the Seine, at Bercy, Passy and Austerlitz. The first line under the Seine, Line 4 between Châtelet and the Left Bank, was built between 1905 and 1909. By 1914, the metro was carrying five hundred million passengers a year.

== Constructing Paris ==
=== Monuments ===
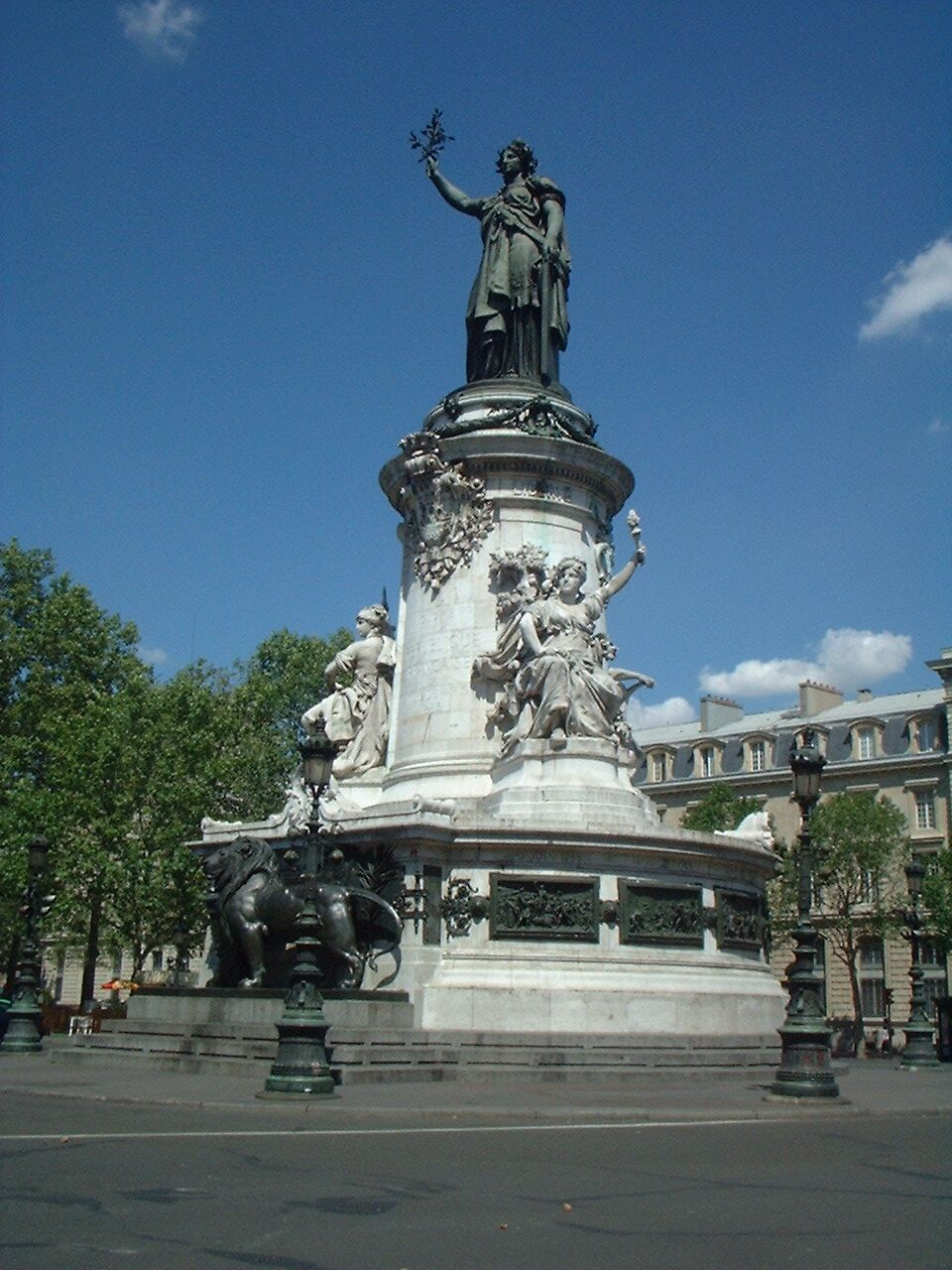
The Republic, a statue in the Place de la République (1883)

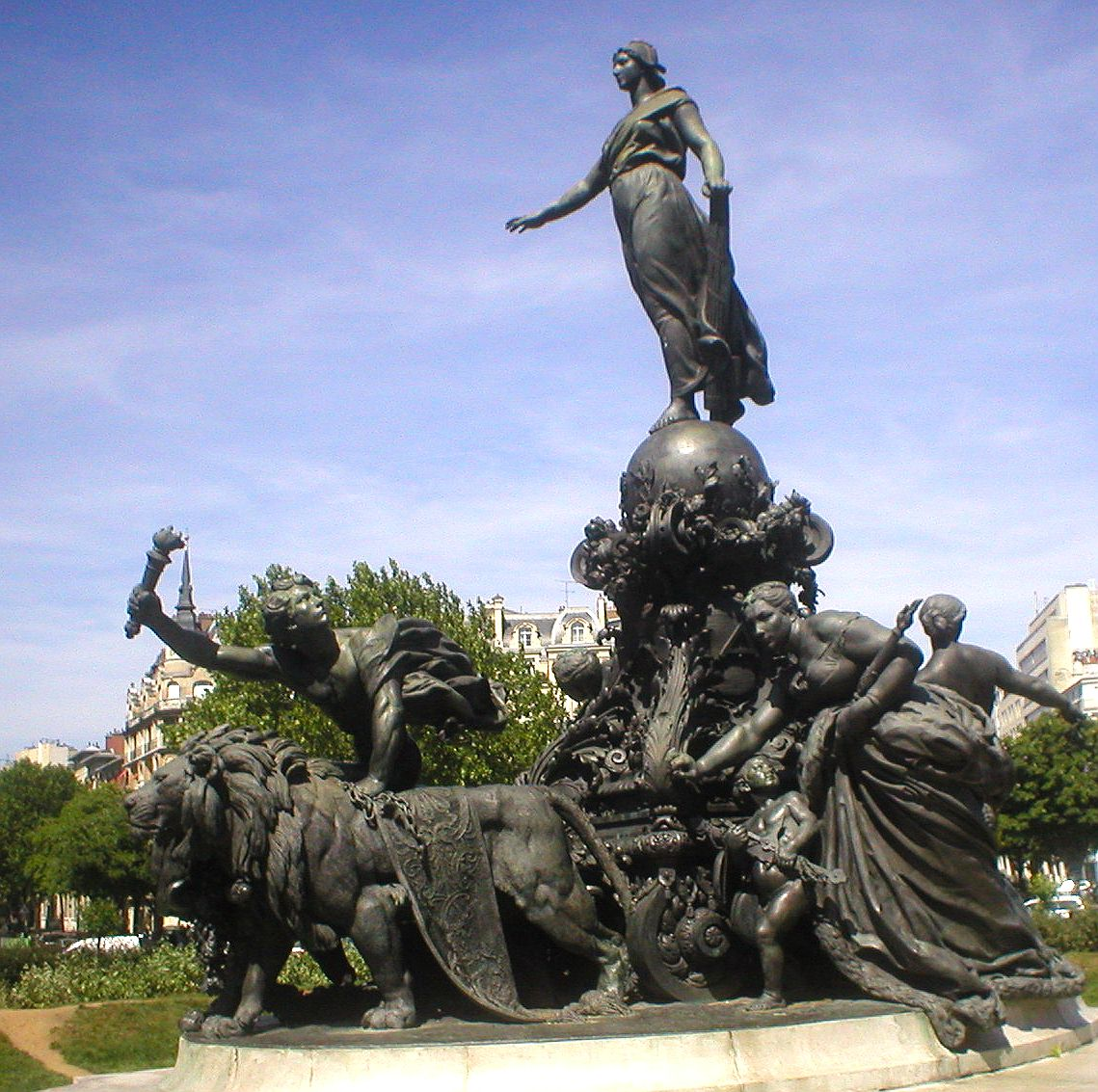
Triumph of the Republic by Jules Dalou on the Place de la Nation (1899)

Most of the notable monuments of the Belle Époque were constructed for use at the Universal Expositions, for example the Eiffel Tower, the Grand Palais, the Petit Palais, and the Pont Alexandre III. The chief architectural legacy of the Third Republic was a large number of new schools and local city halls, all inscribed with the slogans of the republic and statues of allegorical symbols of the republic; representations of scientists, writers and political figures were placed in parks and squares. The largest monument was an allegorical statue of the republic erected in the center of the Place du Château-d'Eau, renamed the Place de la République in 1879. It was an enormous bronze figure 9.5 meters high of the republic holding an olive branch and standing on a pedestal 15 meters high. On 14 July 1880, the Place du Trône was renamed the Place de la Nation, and a group of statues by Jules Dalou, called Triumph of the Republic, was placed in the center. In the middle was Marianne in a chariot drawn by two lions surrounded by allegorical figures of Liberty, Work, Justice and Abundance. A plaster version was put in place in 1889, the bronze version in 1899. A 29-meter tall monument with a statue of another republican hero, Leon Gambetta, surmounted by a pylon crowned by a winged lion, was placed in the Cour Napoléon of the Louvre in 1888. It was taken down in 1954 after destructions during World War II, but some remaining sculptures including that of Gambetta himself were placed in 1982 in the Square Édouard-Vaillant (20th arrondissement) by the socialist president François Mitterrand.

=== Streets and boulevards ===
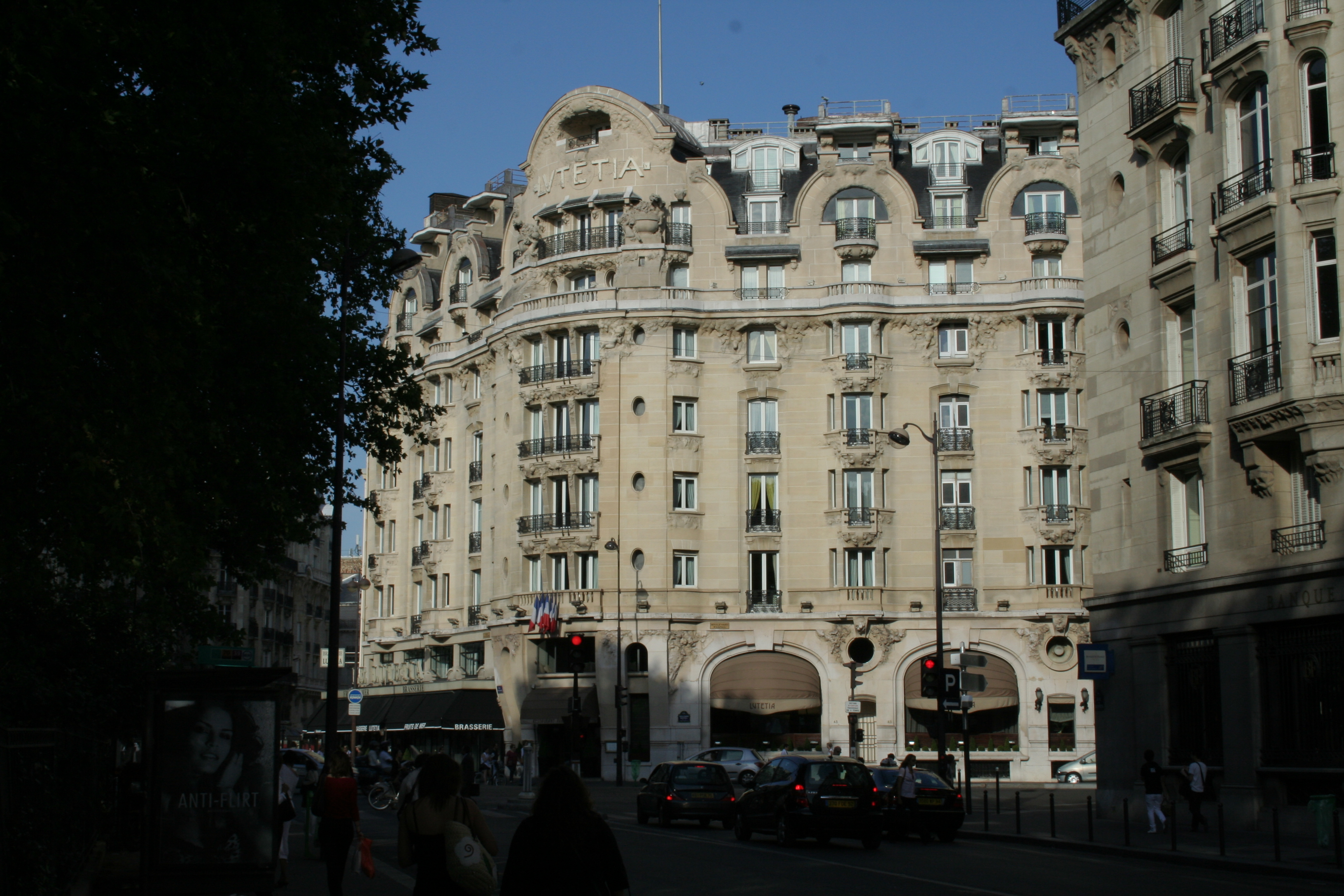
The Hotel Lutetia (1910), with its Art Nouveau façade, reflected the abandonment of the strict façade uniformity of Haussmann's Paris

The construction of the new boulevards and streets begun by Napoleon III and Baron Haussmann had been much criticized by Napoleon's opponents near the end of the Second Empire, but the government of the Third Republic continued his projects. The Avenue de l'Opéra, Boulevard Saint-Germain, Avenue de la République, Boulevard Henry-IV and Avenue Ledru-Rollin were all completed by 1889 essentially as Haussmann had planned them before his death. After 1889, the pace of construction slowed but a few last projects such as the Boulevard Raspail were completed.

=== rue Réaumur ===
In 1898 the Rue Réaumur was extended, and has become known as a high point of post-Haussmannian architecture. An annual Concours competition was launched by the Conseil Municipal of the Third Republic, to attract innovative architectural solutions, now that the Haussman rules had been relaxed. This resulted in several awards for outstanding decorative architecture along the rue Réaumur, including number 116 by Albert Walwein (1851-1916) and number 118 by Charles de Montarnal (1867-1947), which won gold medals in 1897 and 1900 respectively. The new street was inaugurated on 7th February 1897 by Felix Faure, president of the Third Republic, with Pierre Baudin, president of the Conseil Municipal de Paris. . Rue Réaumur became known for being a hub for the press, with L'Intransigeant, Franc Tireur, France-Soir, Défence de la France, L'Algérie Libre, and La Petite République located at 98-100.

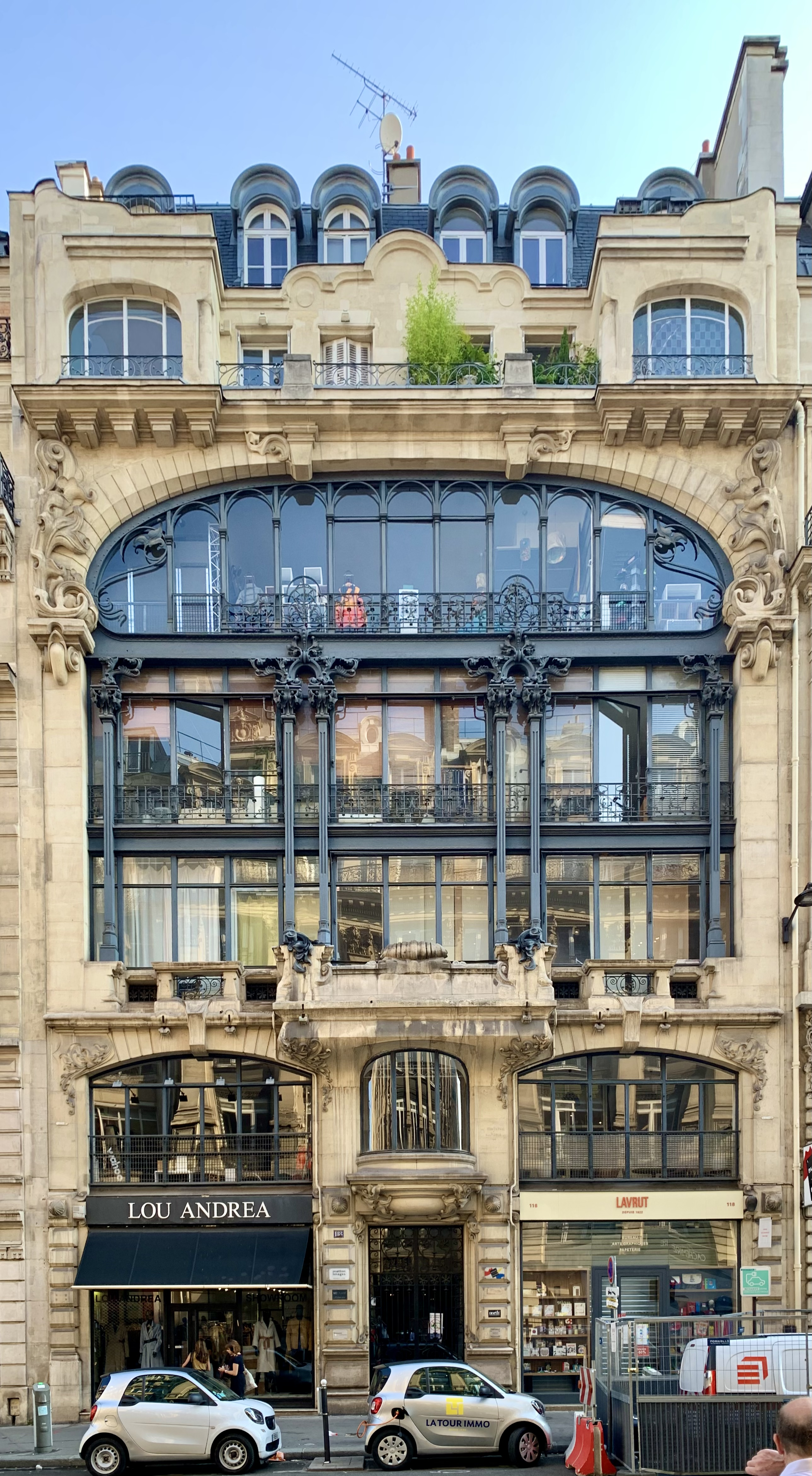
118 Rue Réaumur, Paris (01)

Several new streets were created on the left bank: the Rue de la Convention, Rue de Vouillé, Rue d'Alésia, and Rue de Tolbiac. On the Right Bank, the Rue Étienne-Marcel was the last of the Haussmann projects to be completed before the First World War.

While the streets planned by Haussmann were completed, the strict uniformity of façades and building heights imposed by him was gradually modified. Buildings became much larger and deeper, with two apartments on each floor facing the street and others facing only onto the courtyard. The new buildings often had ornamental rotundas or pavilions on the corners and highly ornamental roof designs and gables. In 1902, maximum building heights were increased to 52 meters. With the advent of elevators, the most desirable apartments were no longer on the lowest floors, but on the highest floors, where there was more light, nicer views and less noise. With the arrival of automobiles and the beginning of traffic noise on the streets, the bedrooms moved to the back of the apartment, overlooking the courtyard.

The façades also changed from the strict symmetry of Haussmann: undulating façades appeared, as did bay and bow windows. Eclectic façades became popular; they often mixed the styles of Louis XIV, Louis XV and Louis XVI, and then, with the advent of Art Nouveau style, floral patterns could be incorporated. The most striking examples of the new architecture were the Castel Béranger on the Rue La Fontaine and the Hôtel Lutetia. Between 1898 and 1905, the city organized eight competitions for the most imaginative building façades; variety was given precedence over uniformity. .

=== Architecture ===
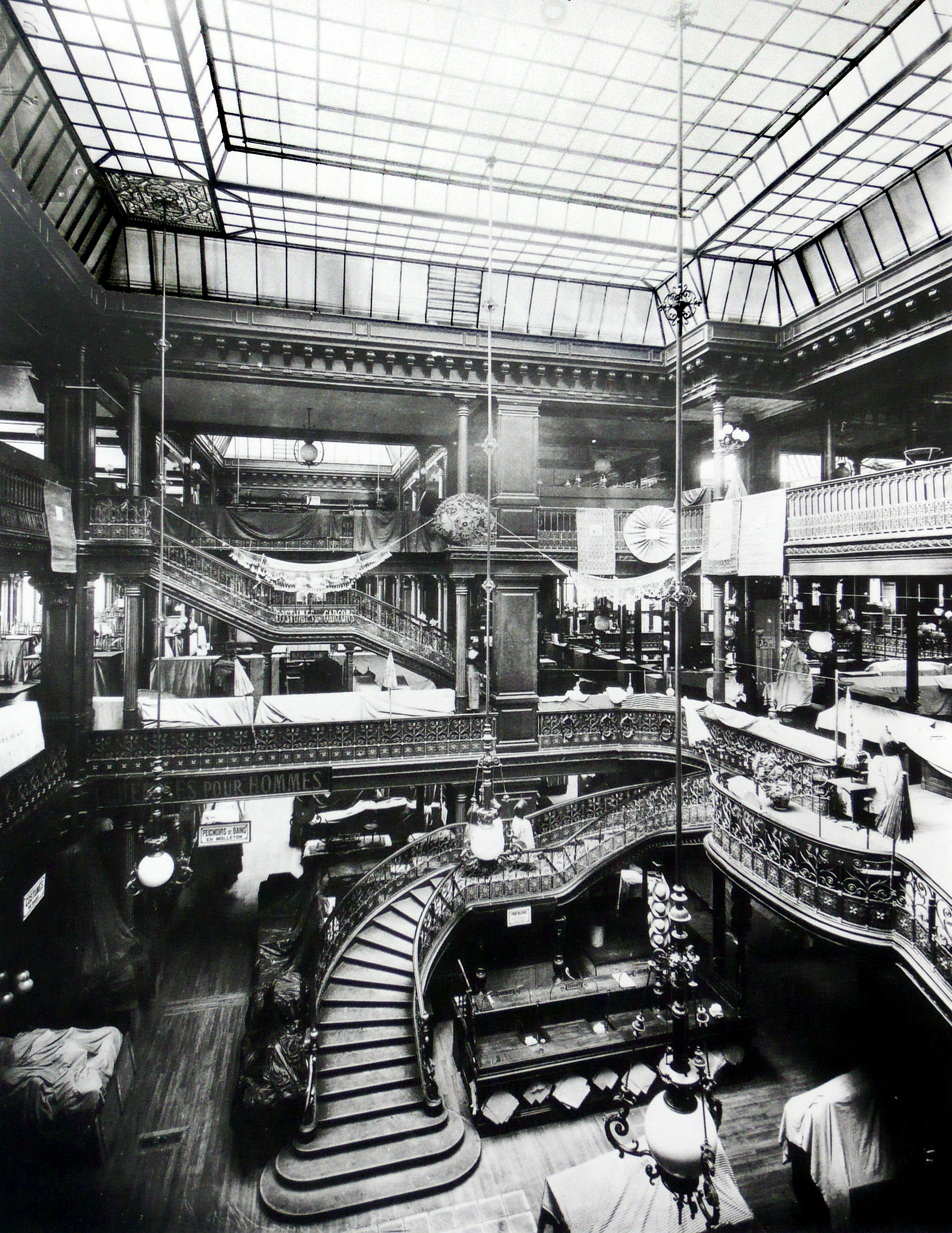
The interior of the Bon Marché department store (1875)

Following the relaxation of the strict rules of Baron Haussman's era, the architectural style of the Belle Époque was eclectic and sometimes combined elements of several different styles. While the structures of the new buildings were resolutely modern, using iron frames and reinforced concrete, the façades ranged from the Romano-Byzantine style of the Basilica of Sacré-Cœur on Montmartre, to the strange neo-Moorish Palais du Trocadéro, to the neo-Renaissance style of the new Hôtel de Ville, to the exuberant reinvention of French classicism of the 17th and 18th centuries in the Grand Palais, Petit Palais and Gare d'Orsay, decorated as they are with domes, colonnades, mosaics and statuary. The most innovative buildings of the period were the Gallery of Machines at the 1889 exposition and the new railroad stations and department stores: their classical exteriors concealed very modern interiors with large open spaces and large glass skylights made possible by the new engineering techniques of the period. The Eiffel Tower shocked many traditional Parisians, both because of its appearance and because it was the first building in Paris taller than the cathedral of Notre-Dame.

Art Nouveau became the most striking stylistic innovation of the period in architecture. It is associated particularly with the metro station entrances designed by Hector Guimard and a handful of buildings, including Guimard's Castel Béranger (1889) at 14 Rue La Fontaine and the Hôtel Mezzara (1910) in the 16th arrondissement. The enthusiasm for Art Nouveau metro station entrances did not last long; in 1904 it was replaced at the Opéra metro station by a less exuberant "modern" style. Beginning in 1912, all the Guimard metro entrances were replaced with functional entrances without decoration.

A revolutionary new building material, reinforced concrete, appeared at the beginning of the 20th century and quietly began to change the face of Paris. The first church built in the new material was Saint-Jean de Montmartre, at 19 Rue des Abbesses at the foot of Montmartre. The architect was Anatole de Baudot, a student of Viollet-le-Duc. The nature of the revolution was not evident, because Baudot faced the concrete with brick and ceramic tiles in a colorful Art Nouveau style with stained glass windows in the same style.

The Conseil Municipal of Paris instituted an architecture prize, named the Concours de façades de la ville de Paris inspired by a similar contest in Brussels, shortly after the creation of the Rue Réaumur in 1897. The aim was to promote inventive design and construction in new buildings on this street. The contest was initially restricted to the Rue Réaumur, but was ultimately extended to the whole of Paris.

The awards were inaugurated in a ceremony led by president Felix Faure, and made annually from 16th December 1897 to the late 1930s, with an interruption during World War I, singling out several buildings completed every year for praise.

In 1904 the jury was made up of five members of the Conseil Municipal : Quentin-Bauchart, Ernest Caron, Froment-Meurice, Chérioux, Ballières, Joseph Antoine Bouvard, director of Architectural Services, and Nicolas Sauger (1838-1918), architectural overseer for the city of Paris, with Jean-Louis Pascal and Joseph Auguste Émile Vaudremer.

The Théâtre des Champs-Élysées (1913) is another architectural landmark of the period, one of the few Paris buildings in the Art Deco style. Designed by Auguste Perret, it was also built of reinforced concrete and decorated by some of the leading artists of the era: bas-reliefs on the façade by Antoine Bourdelle, a dome by Maurice Denis, and paintings in the interior by Édouard Vuillard. It was the setting in 1913 for one of the major musical events of the Belle Époque: the premiere of Igor Stravinsky's The Rite of Spring.

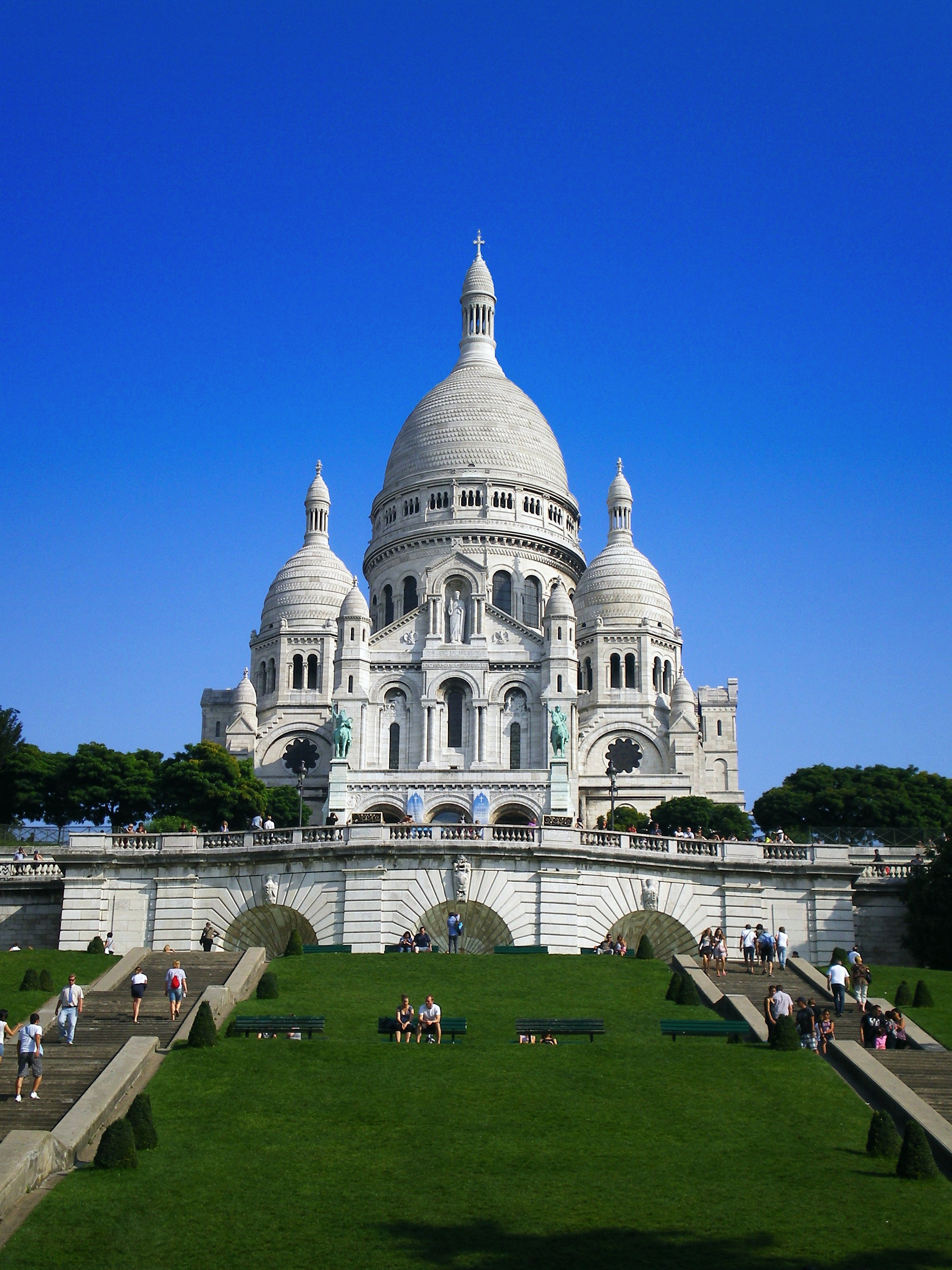
The Romano-Byzantine style of the Basilica of Sacré-Cœur (1873-1919)

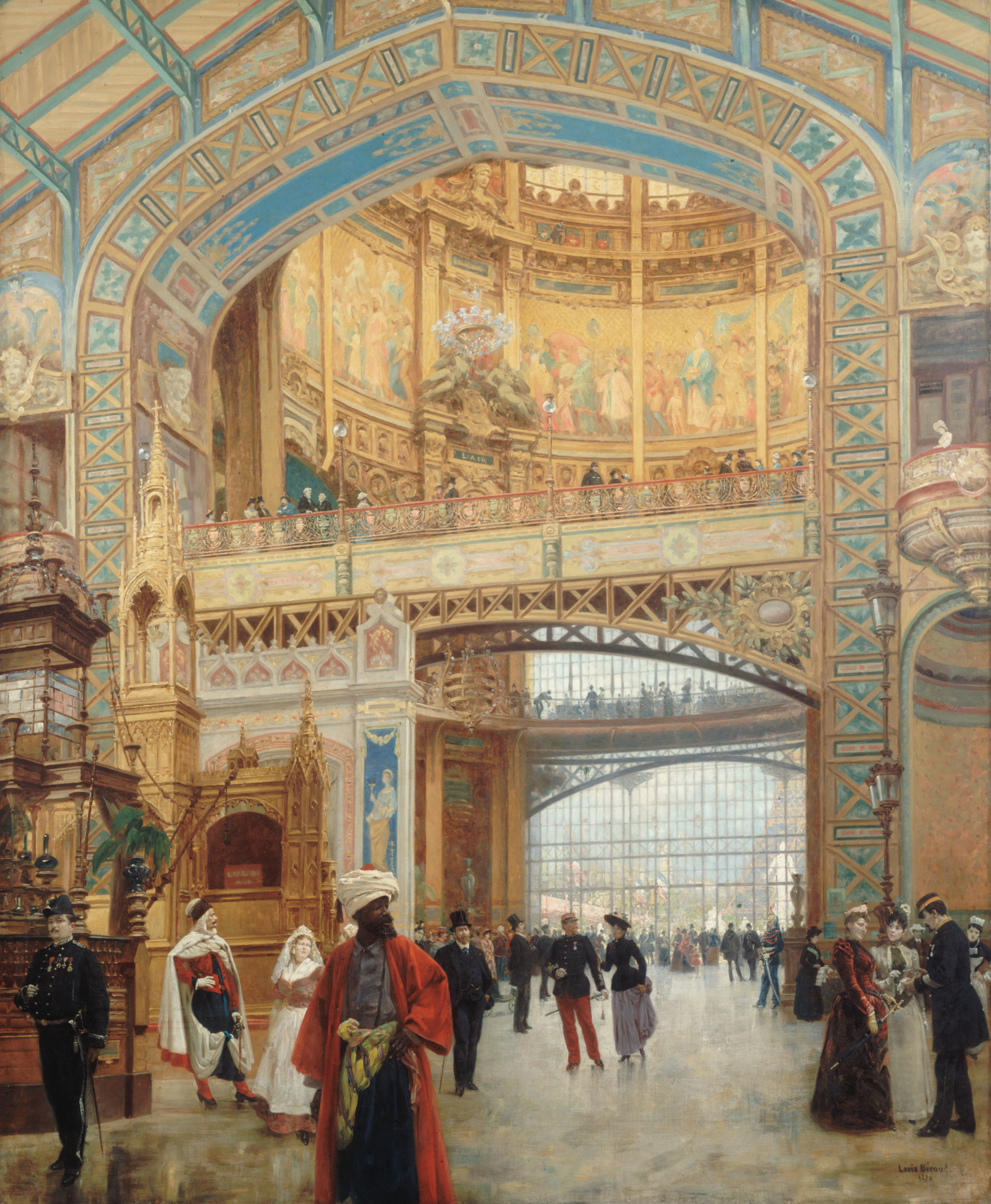
The Gallery of Machines from the Universal Exposition of 1889

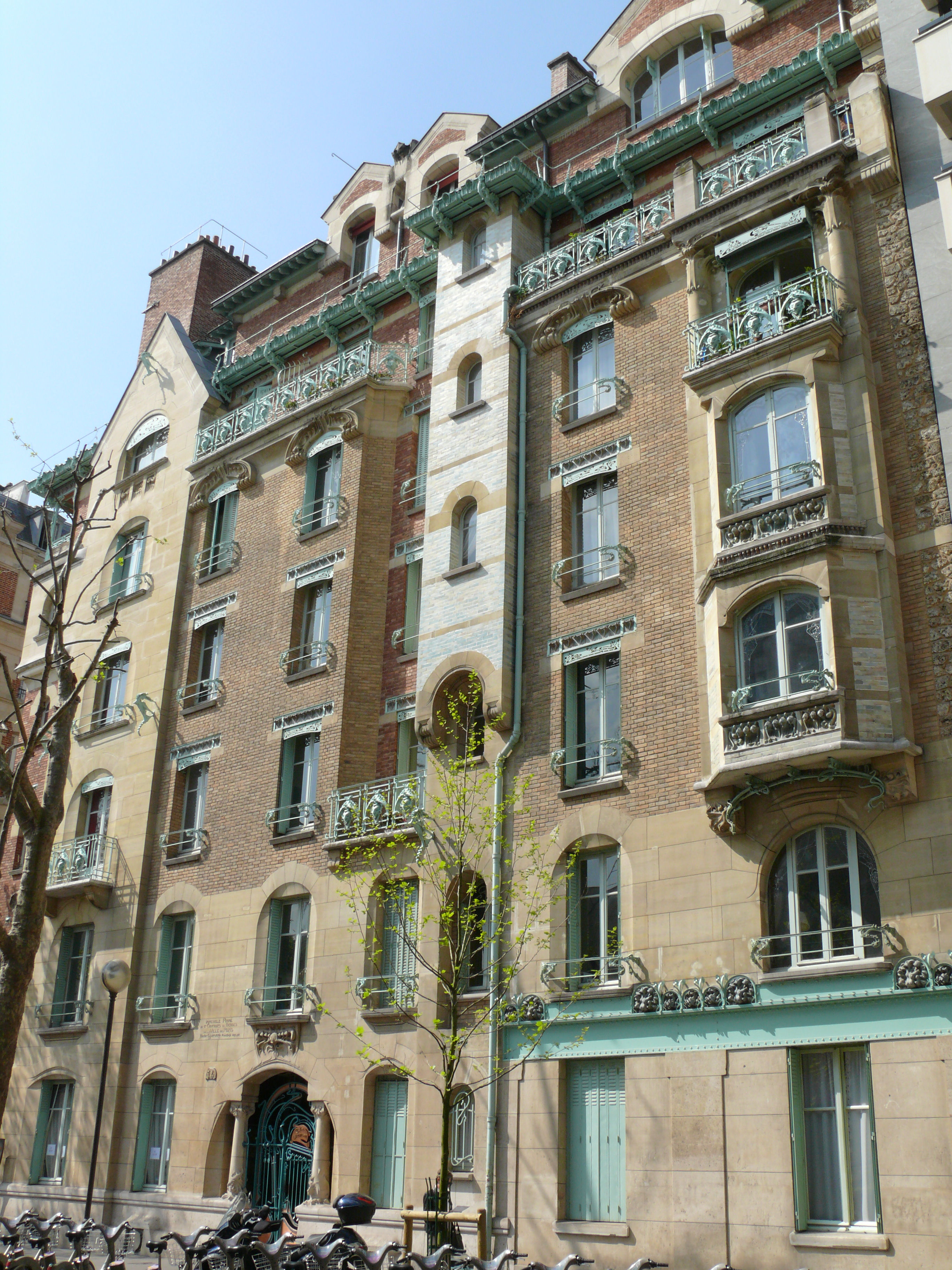
The Castel Béranger by Hector Guimard (1899)

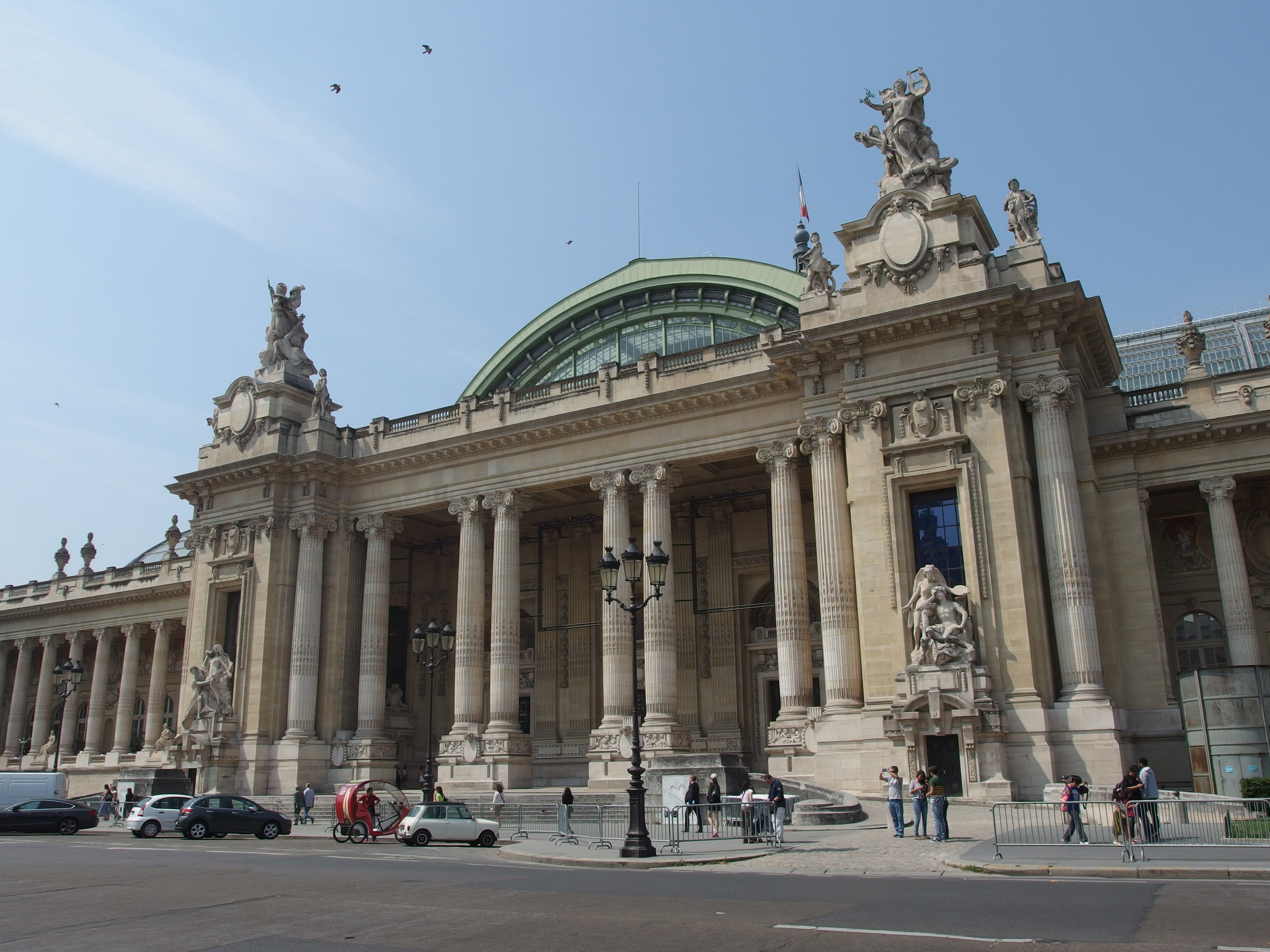
The Grand Palais (1900)

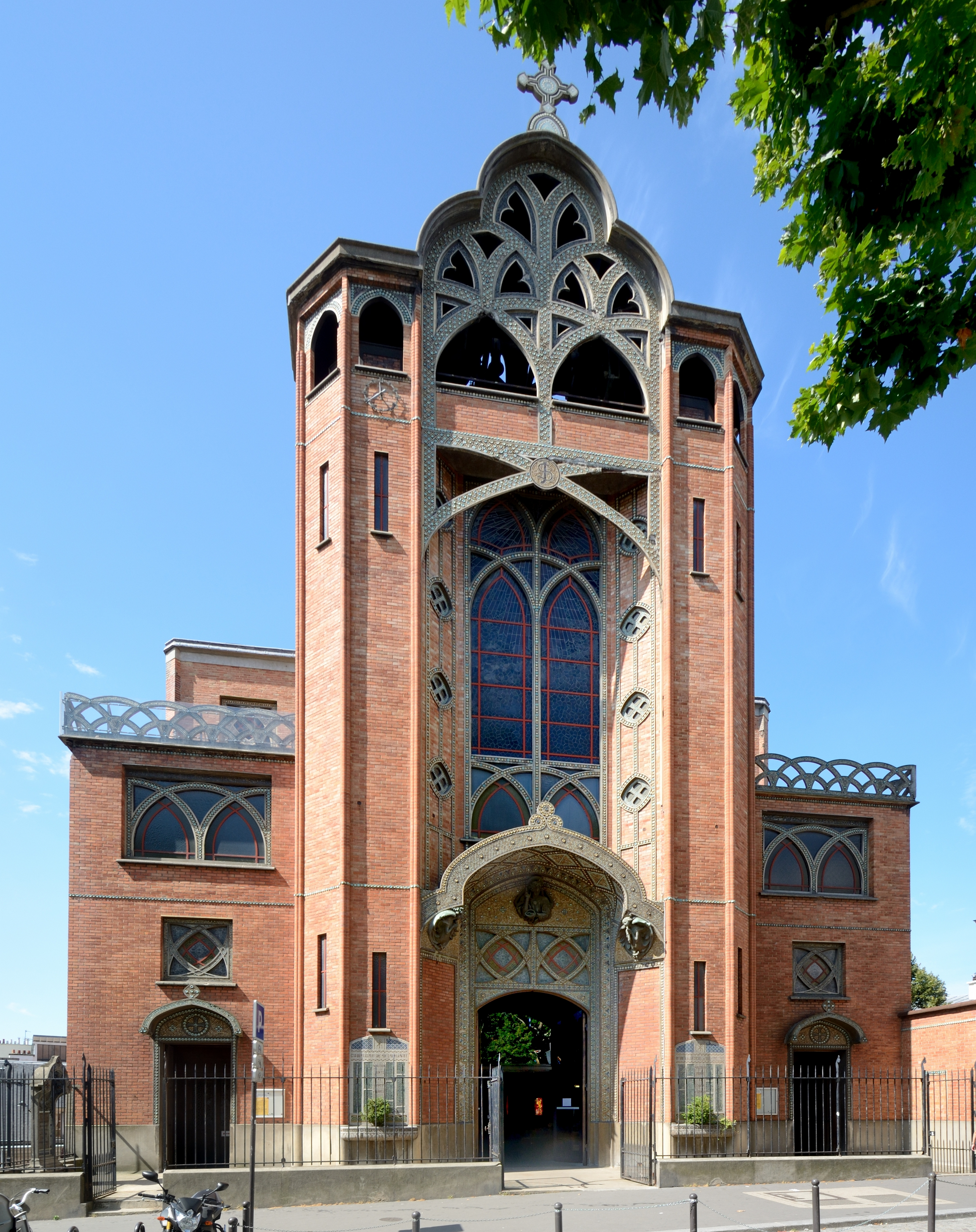
The Church of Saint-Jean-de-Montmartre (1894-1904), the first church built of reinforced concrete

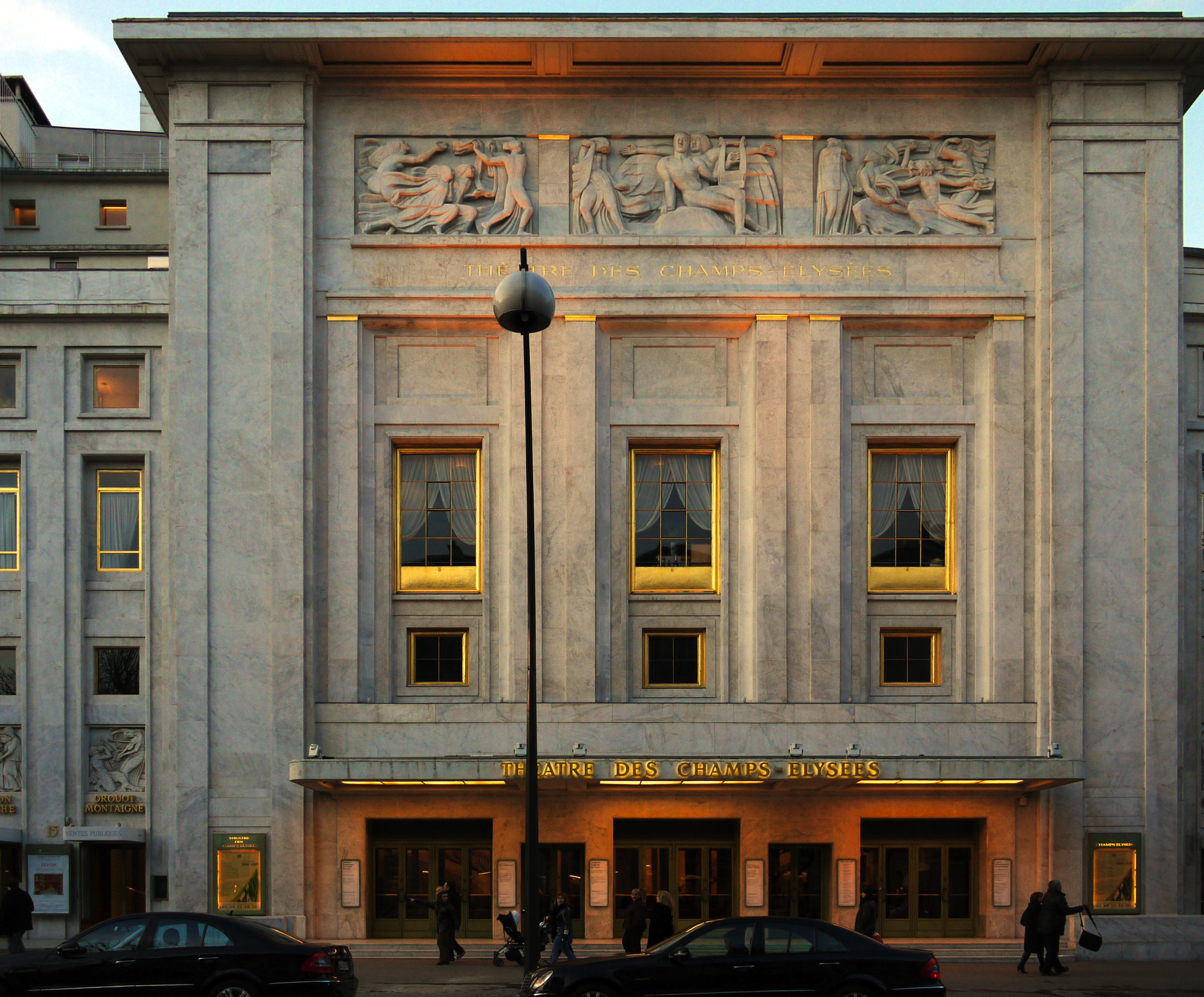
The Théâtre des Champs-Élysées (1913) in Art Deco style

=== Bridges ===
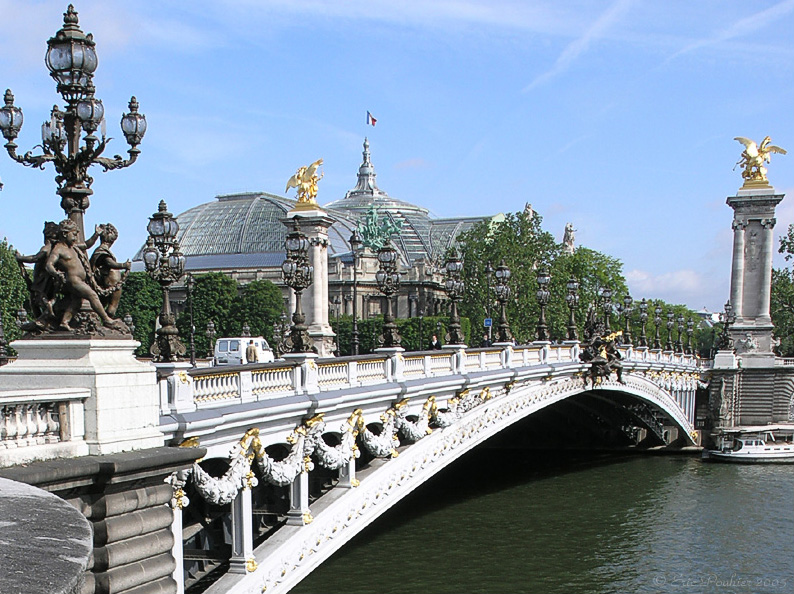
The Pont Alexandre III and the Grand Palais, legacies of the Paris Universal Exposition of 1900

Eight new bridges were put across the Seine during the Belle Époque. The Pont Sully, built in 1876, replaced two foot bridges that had connected the Île Saint-Louis to the Right and Left Bank. The Pont de Tolbiac was built in 1882 to connect the Left Bank with Bercy. The Pont Mirabeau, made famous in a poem by Apollinaire, was dedicated in 1895. Three bridges were built for the 1900 Exposition: the Pont Alexandre-III, dedicated by Czar Nicholas II of Russia in 1896, which connected the Left Bank with the grand exposition halls of the Grand Palais and Petit Palais; the Passerelle Debilly, a foot bridge that linked two sections of the Exposition; and a railroad bridge between Grenelle and Passy. Two more bridges were dedicated in 1905: the Pont de Passy (now the Pont de Bir-Hakeim), and the Viaduc d'Austerlitz, crossed by the metro.

=== Parks, gardens and squares ===
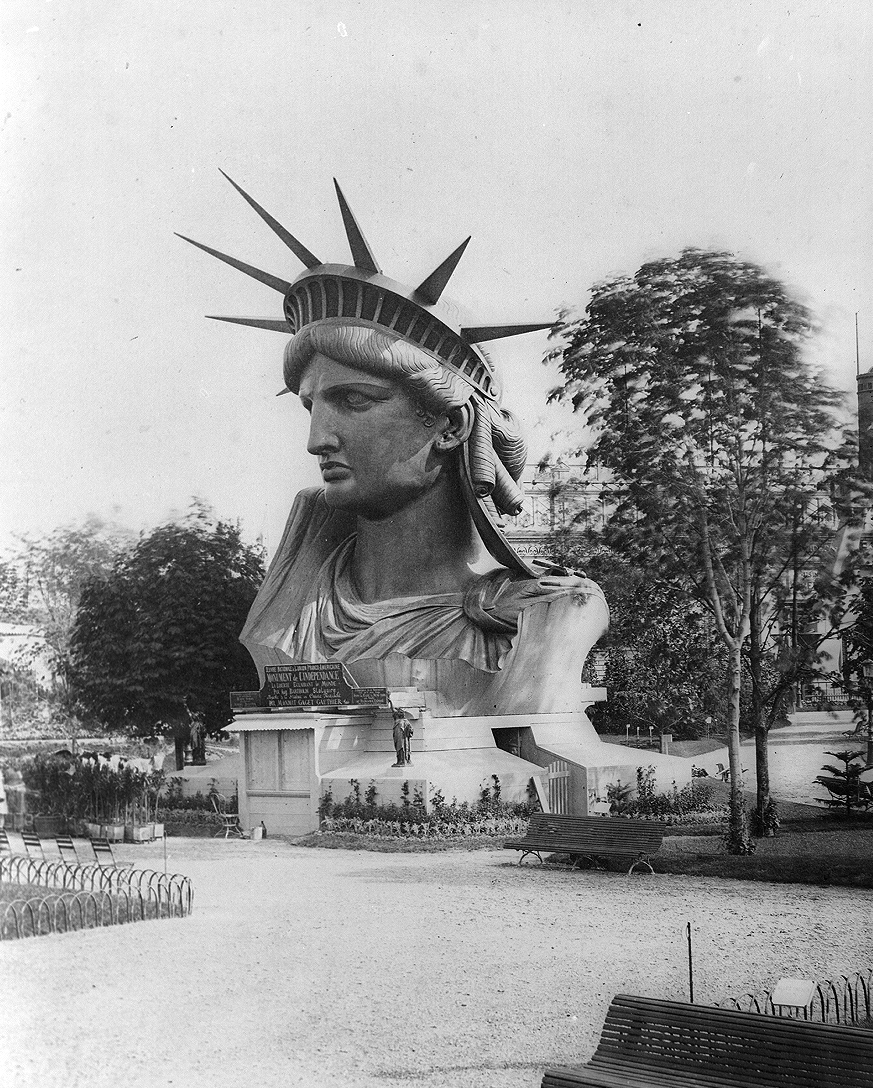
At the Exposition Universelle of 1878, the Gardens of the Trocadéro displayed the full-size head of the Statue of Liberty (Liberty Enlightening the World) before the statue was completed and shipped to New York City.

The work of creating parks, squares and promenades during the Belle Époque continued in the Second Empire style. The projects were managed at first by Jean-Charles Adolphe Alphand, who had been the head of department of parks and promenades under Haussmann and was elevated to the post of Director of Public Works of Paris, a position he held until his death in 1891. He was also the director of works of the 1889 Universal Exposition, responsible for building the exposition's gardens and pavilions. Alphand finished several of the projects begun under Haussmann: the Parc Montsouris (1869–1878), the Square Boucicaut (1873), and the Square Popincourt (later renamed Parmentier, and still later Maurice-Gardette), which replaced a demolished slaughterhouse and opened in 1872. Alphand's first major project of the Belle Époque was the Jardins du Trocadéro, the site of the Universal Exposition of 1878 that surrounded the enormous Palais de Trocadéro, which served as the main building for the exposition. He filled the park with a grotto, fountains, gardens and statues (the statues can now be seen on the parvis of the Musée d'Orsay). The park also displayed the full-sized head of the Statue of Liberty (Liberty Enlightening the World) before the statue was completed and shipped to New York City. The grotto and much of the park are still preserved as they were. It was used again for the Universal Exposition of 1889 Exposition, and with new fountains and a new palace added, it was also used for the Universal Exposition of 1937.

During the exposition of 1878, Alphand used the Champ de Mars as the site of a huge iron-framed exhibit hall, 725 meters long, surrounded by gardens. For the 1889 exposition, the same site was occupied by the Eiffel Tower and the huge Gallery of Machines, plus two large exhibit halls: the Palace of Liberal Arts and the Palace of Fine Arts. The two palaces were designed by Jean-Camille Formigé, the chief architect of Paris. The two palaces and the Gallery of Machines were demolished after the exposition, but in 1909, Formigé was given the task of transforming the exposition site around the Eiffel Tower into a park with broad lawns, promenades and groves of trees in the form it is today.

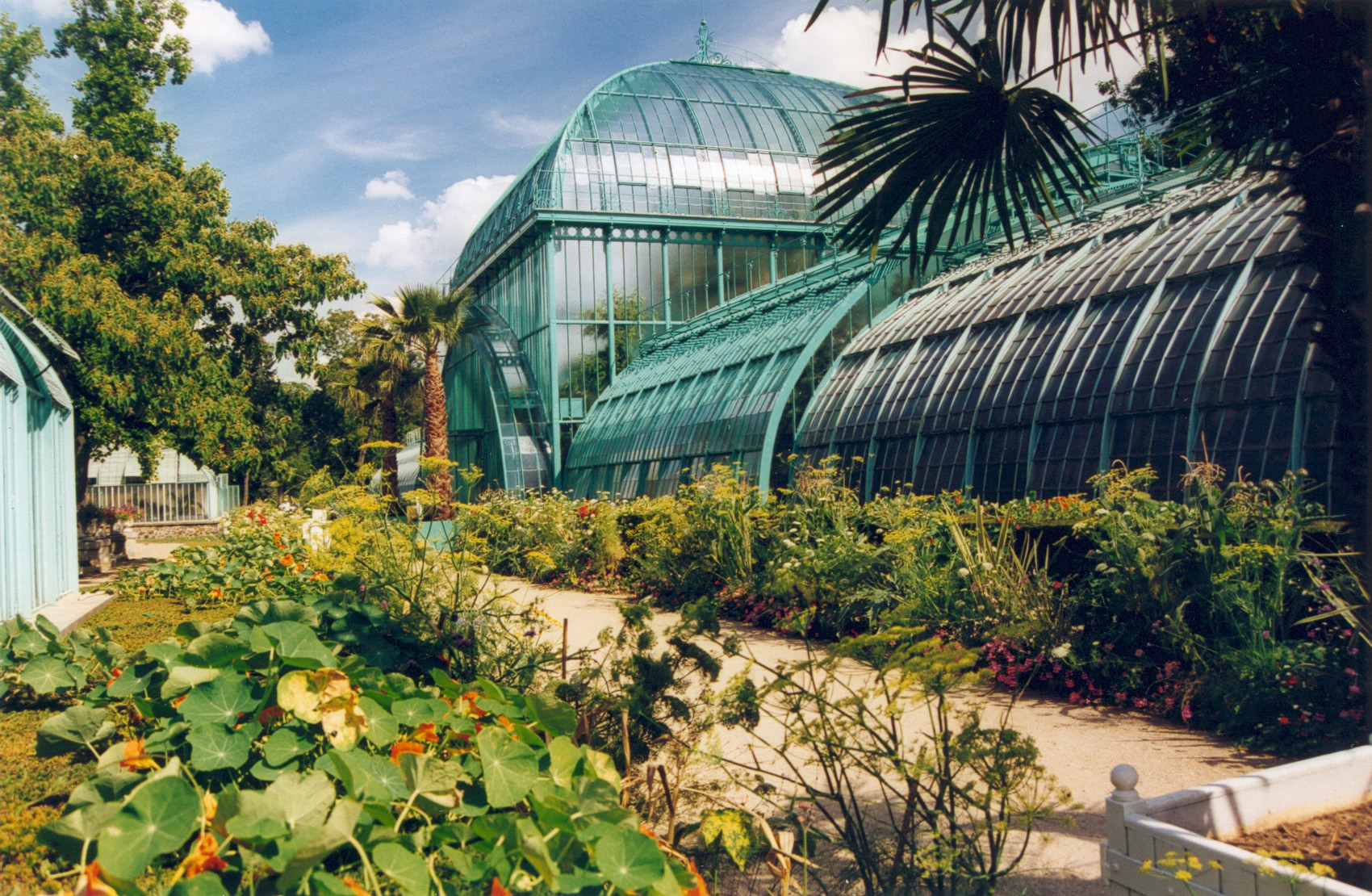
The Serres d'Auteuil (1898), next to the Bois de Boulogne, provided trees, shrubs and flowers for all the parks of Paris

Between 1895 and 1898, Formigé created another Belle Époque landmark, the Serres d'Auteuil, a complex of large greenhouses designed to grow trees and plants for all the gardens and parks of Paris. The largest structure, one hundred meters long, was designed to grow tropical plants. The greenhouses still exist today and are open to the public.

Other than the parks of the expositions, no other large Paris parks were created in the Belle Époque, but several squares of about one hectare each were created. They all had the same basic design: a bandstand in the center, a fence, groves of trees and flower beds, and often also statues. These included the Square Édouard-Vaillant in the 20th arrondissement (1879), the Square Samuel-de-Champlain in the 20th arrondissement (1889), the Square des Épinettes in the 17th arrondissement (1893), the Square Scipion in the 5th arrondissement (1899), the Square Paul-Painlevé in the 5th arrondissement (1899) and the Square Carpeaux in the 18th arrondissement (1907).

The best-known and most picturesque park of the period is that composed of the Squares Willette and Nadar on the slope directly below the Basilica of Sacré-Cœur on Montmartre. It was begun by Formigé in 1880, but not completed until 1927 by another architect, Léopold Béviére, after the death of Formigé in 1926. The park features terraces and slopes dropping eighty meters from the Basilica to the street below, and has one of the best-known views in Paris.

=== Street lighting ===
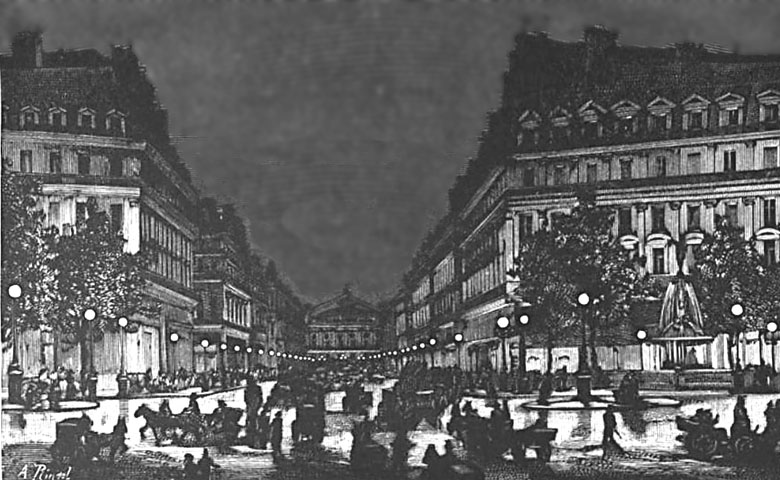
The first electric street lights in Paris, on the Avenue de l'Opéra (1878)

At the beginning of the Belle Époque, Paris was lit by a constellation of thousands of gaslights that were often admired by foreign visitors. It was at the beginning of 1876 that Paris began to be called the “City of Light(s)” (Ville-Lumière), initially in an ideological sense, before gradually coming to refer to the city’s illumination itself. In 1870, there were 56,573 gaslights used exclusively to illuminate the streets of the city. The gas was produced by ten enormous factories around the edge of the city that were located near the circle of fortifications. It was distributed in pipes installed under the new boulevards and streets. The street lights were placed every twenty meters on the Grands Boulevards. At a predetermined minute after nightfall, a small army of 750 uniformed allumeurs ("lighters") carrying long poles with small lamps at the end went out into the streets to turn on a pipe of gas inside each lamppost and light the lamp. The entire city was illuminated within forty minutes. The Arc de Triomphe was crowned with a ring of gaslights, and the Champs-Élysées was lined with ribbons of white light.

One of the major urban innovations in Paris was the introduction of electric street lights to coincide with the opening of the Universal Exposition of 1878. The first streets lit were the Avenue de l'Opéra and the Place de l'Étoile around the Arc de Triomphe. In 1881, electric street lights were added along the Grands Boulevards. Electric lighting came much more slowly for residences and businesses in some Paris neighborhoods. While electric lights lined the Champs-Élysées in 1905, there was no electric lines for any households in the 20th arrondissement.

== The Paris Universal Expositions ==
The three "universal expositions" that took place in Paris during the Belle Époque attracted millions of visitors from around the world and displayed the newest innovations in science and technology, from the telephone and phonograph to electric street lighting.

=== The 1878 Universal Exposition ===
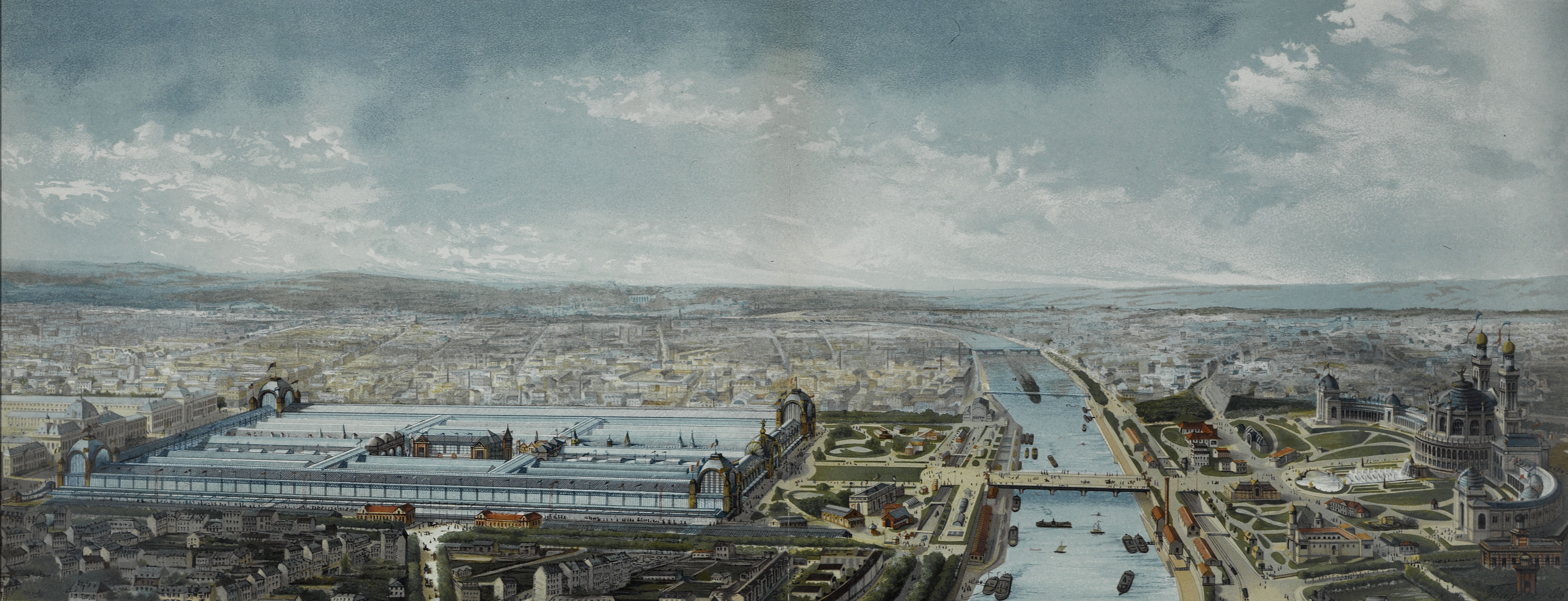
Aerial view of the Universal Exposition of 1878

The Universal Exposition of 1878, which lasted from 1 May to 10 November 1878, was designed to advertise the recovery of France from the 1870 Franco-German War and the destruction of the period of the Paris Commune. It took place on both sides of the Seine, in the Champ de Mars and the heights of Trocadéro, where the first Palais du Trocadéro was built. Many of the buildings were made of new inexpensive material called staff, which was composed of jute fiber, plaster of Paris, and cement. The main exposition hall was an enormous rectangular structure, the Palace of Machines, where the Eiffel Tower is located today. Inside, Alexander Graham Bell displayed his new telephone and Thomas Edison presented his phonograph. The head of the newly finished Statue of Liberty (Liberty Enlightening the World) was displayed before it was sent to New York City to be attached to the body. Important congresses and conferences took place on the margins of the exposition, including the first congress on intellectual property, led by Victor Hugo, whose proposals led eventually to the first copyright laws, and a conference on education for the blind, which led to the adoption of the Braille system of reading for the blind. The exposition attracted thirteen million visitors, and was a financial success.

=== The 1889 Universal Exposition ===
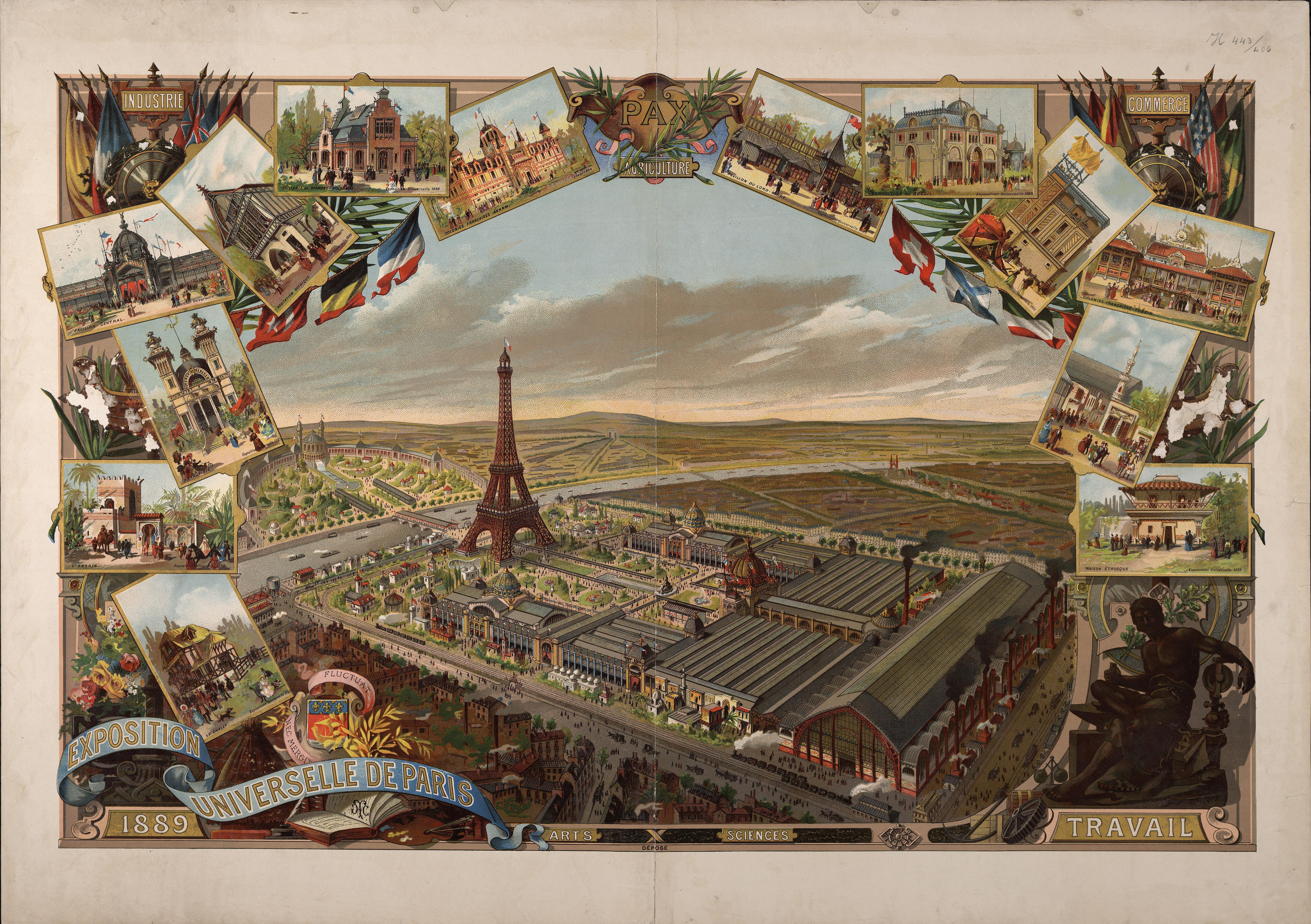
The Eiffel Tower was the gateway of the Universal Exposition of 1889

The Universal Exposition of 1889 took place from 6 May until 31 October 1889 and celebrated the centenary of the beginning of the French Revolution; one of the structures on the grounds was a replica of the Bastille. It took place on the Champ de Mars, the hill of Chaillot, and along the Seine at the Quai d'Orsay. The most memorable feature was the Eiffel Tower, 300 meters tall when it opened (now 324 with the addition of broadcast antennas), which served as the gateway to the exposition. The Eiffel Tower remained the world's tallest structure until 1930. It was not popular with everyone; its modern style was denounced in a public letter by many of France's most prominent cultural figures, including Guy de Maupassant, Charles Gounod and Charles Garnier. The largest building was the iron-framed Gallery of Machines, at the time the largest covered interior space in the world. Other popular exhibits included the first musical fountain, lit with colored electric lights that changed in time to music. Buffalo Bill and sharpshooter Annie Oakley drew large crowds to their Wild West Show at the exposition. The exposition welcomed 23 million visitors.

=== The 1900 Universal Exposition ===
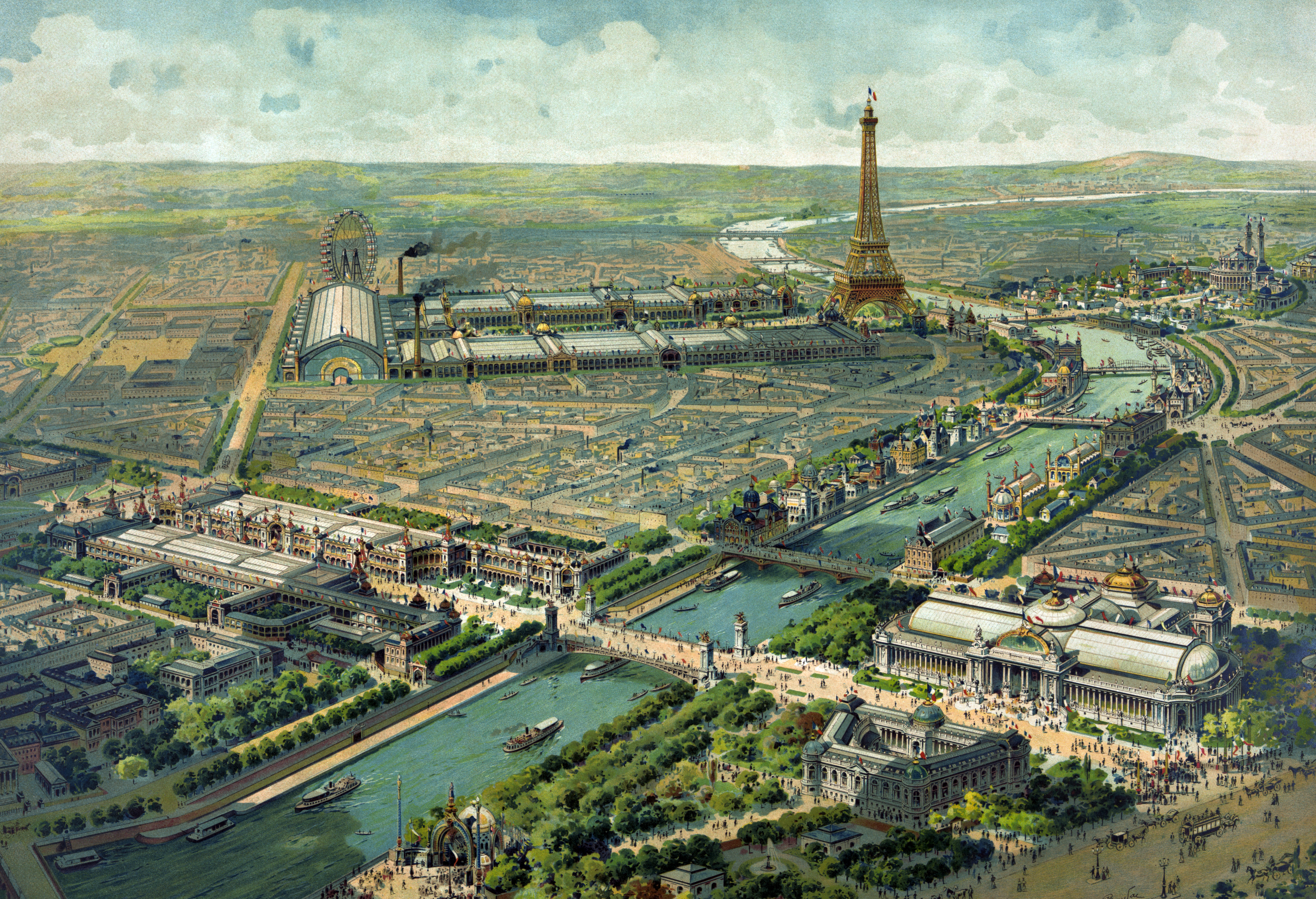
The Universal Exposition of 1900 included events at the Grand Palais and Petit Palais as well as the Eiffel Tower and Chaillot

The Universal Exposition of 1900 took place from 15 April until 12 November 1900. It celebrated the turn of the century and was by far the largest in scale of the Expositions; its sites included the Champ de Mars, Chaillot, the Grand Palais and the Petit Palais. Beside the Eiffel Tower, it featured the world's largest ferris wheel, the "Grande Roue de Paris", one hundred metres high, that could carry sixteen hundred passengers in forty cars. Inside the exhibit hall, Rudolph Diesel demonstrated his new engine, and one of the first escalators was on display. The Exposition coincided with the 1900 Paris Olympics, the first Olympic games held outside of Greece. The Exposition popularized a new artistic style, the Art nouveau, to the world. Two architectural legacies of the Exposition, the Grand Palais and Petit Palais, are still in place in the city. Though it was a great popular success, attracting an estimated forty-eight million visitors, the 1900 exposition lost money and was the last such exposition in Paris on such a grand scale.

== Restaurants, cafés, and brasseries ==
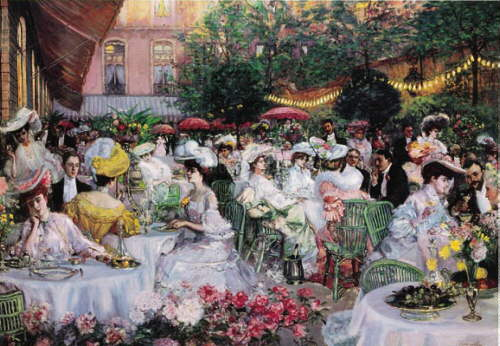
Dining in the garden of the Ritz, a painting by Pierre-Georges Jeanniot (1904)

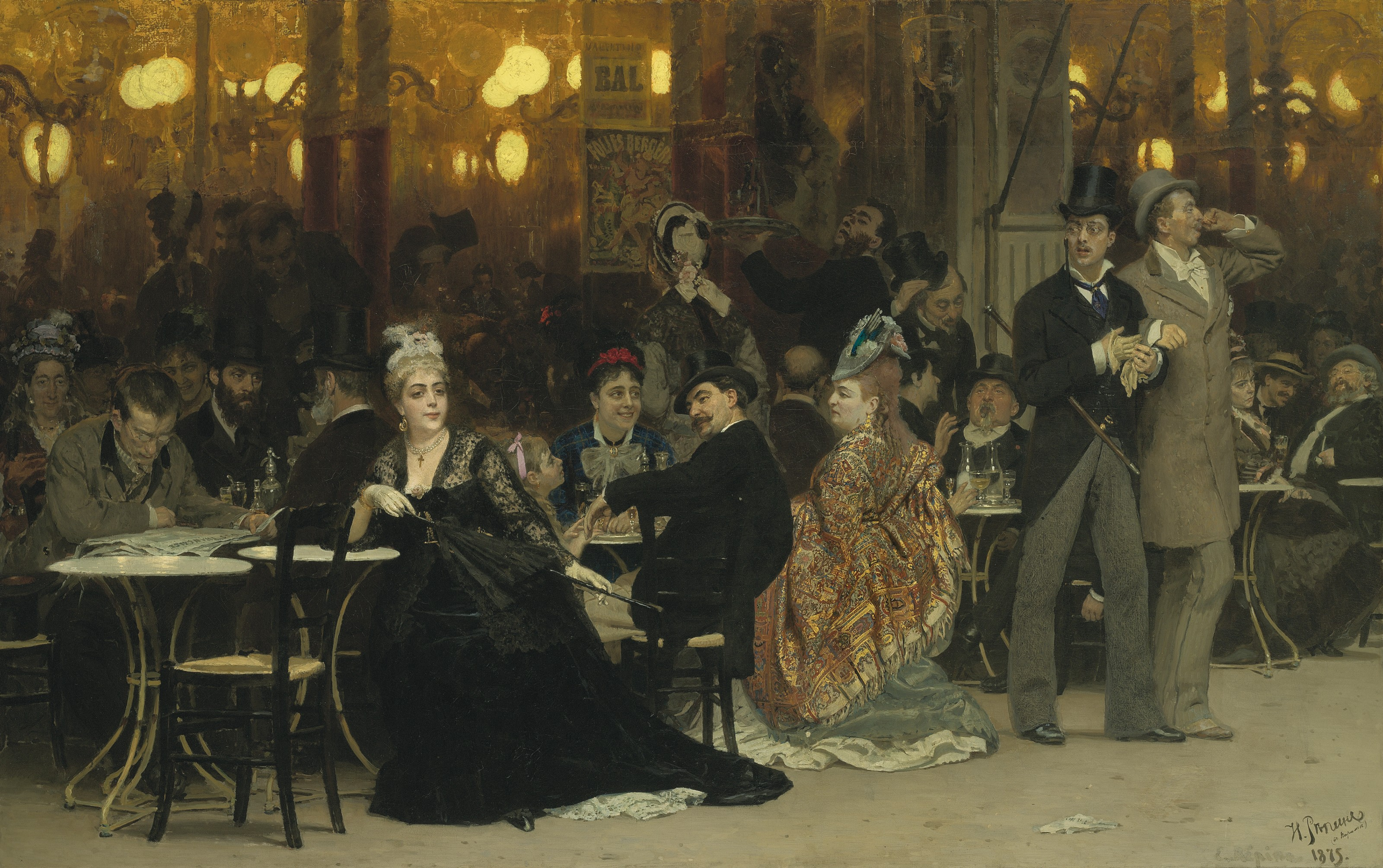
A Parisian café by Ilya Repin (1875)

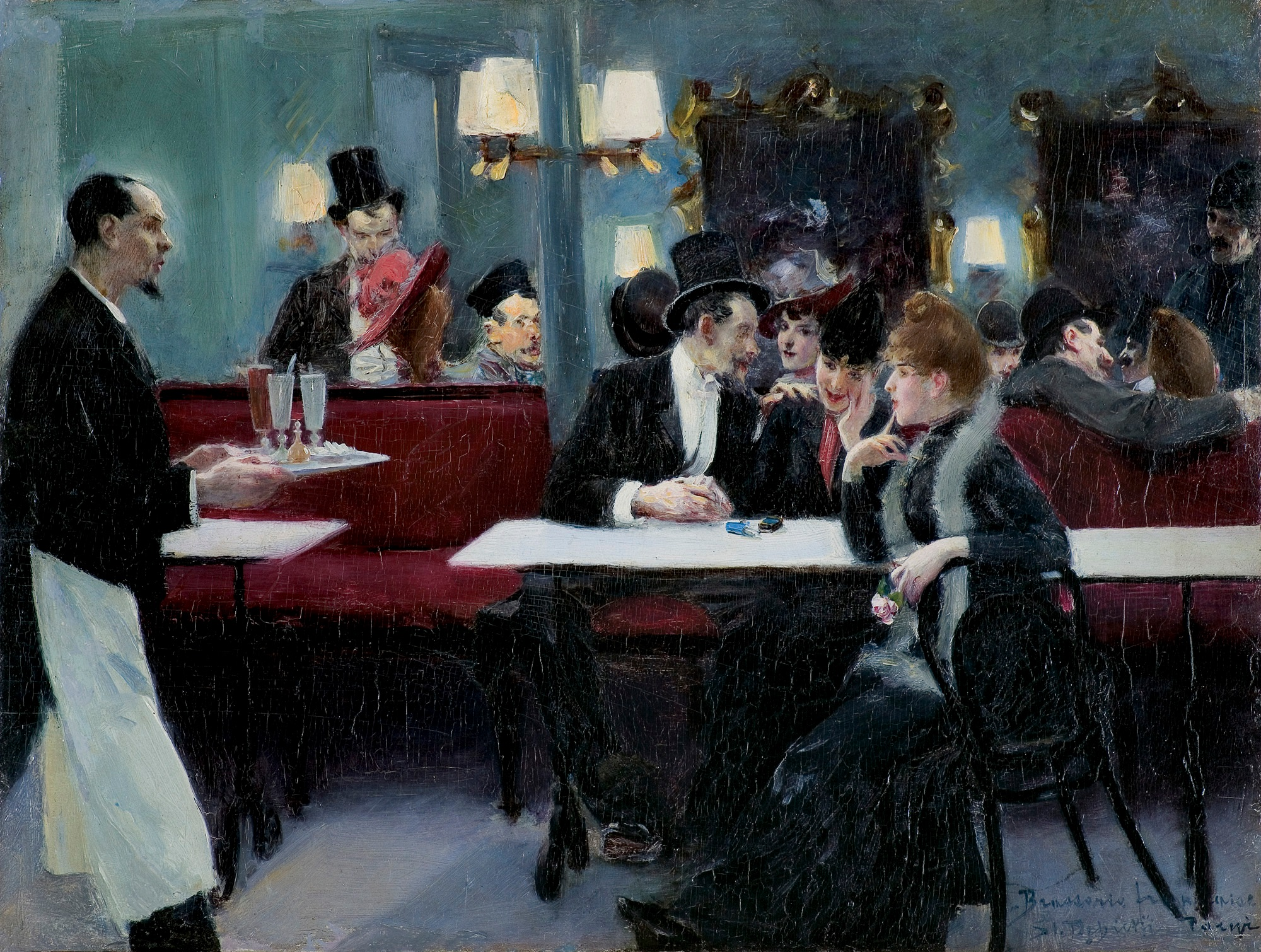
Brasserie by Stanisław Dębicki (c. 1890-1891)

Paris was already famous for its restaurants in the first half of the 19th century, particularly the Café Riche, the Maison Dorée and the Café Anglais on the Grands Boulevards, where the wealthy personalities of Balzac's novels would dine. The Second Empire had added more luxury restaurants, particularly in the center near the new grand hotels: Durand at the Madeleine; Voisin on the Rue Cambon and Rue Saint-Honoré; Magny on the Rue Mazet; Foyot near the Luxembourg Gardens; and Maire at the corner of the Boulevard de Strasbourg and Boulevard Saint-Denis, where lobster thermidor was invented. During the Belle Époque, many more prestigious restaurants could be found, including Laurent, Fouquet's and the Pavillon de l'Élysée on the Champs-Élysées; the Tour d'Argent on the Quai de la Tournelle; Prunier on the Rue Duphot; Drouant on the Place Gaillon; Lapérouse on the Quai des Grands-Augustins; Lucas Carton at the Madeleine, and Weber on the Rue Royale. The most famous restaurant of the period, Maxim's, also opened its doors on the Rue Royale. Two luxury restaurants were found by the lakes in the Bois de Boulogne: the Pavillon d'Armenonville and the Cascade.

For those with more modest budgets, there was the Bouillon, a type of restaurant begun by a butcher named Duval in 1867. These establishment served simple and inexpensive food and were popular with students and visitors. One from this period, Chartier, near the Grands Boulevards, still exists.

A new type of restaurant, the Brasserie, appeared in Paris during the 1867 Universal Exposition. The name originally meant a place that brewed beer, but in 1867 it was a type of café where young women in the national costumes of different countries served different drinks of those countries, including beer, ale, chianti, and vodka. The idea was continued after the Exposition by the Brasserie de l'Espérance on the Rue Champollion on the Left Bank, and was soon imitated by others. By 1890, there were forty-two brasseries on the Left Bank, with names including the Brasserie des Amours, the Brasserie de la Vestale, the Brasserie des Belles Marocaines, and the Brasserie des Excentriques Polonais (brasserie of the eccentric Poles), and they were often used as a place to meet prostitutes.

== Sports ==
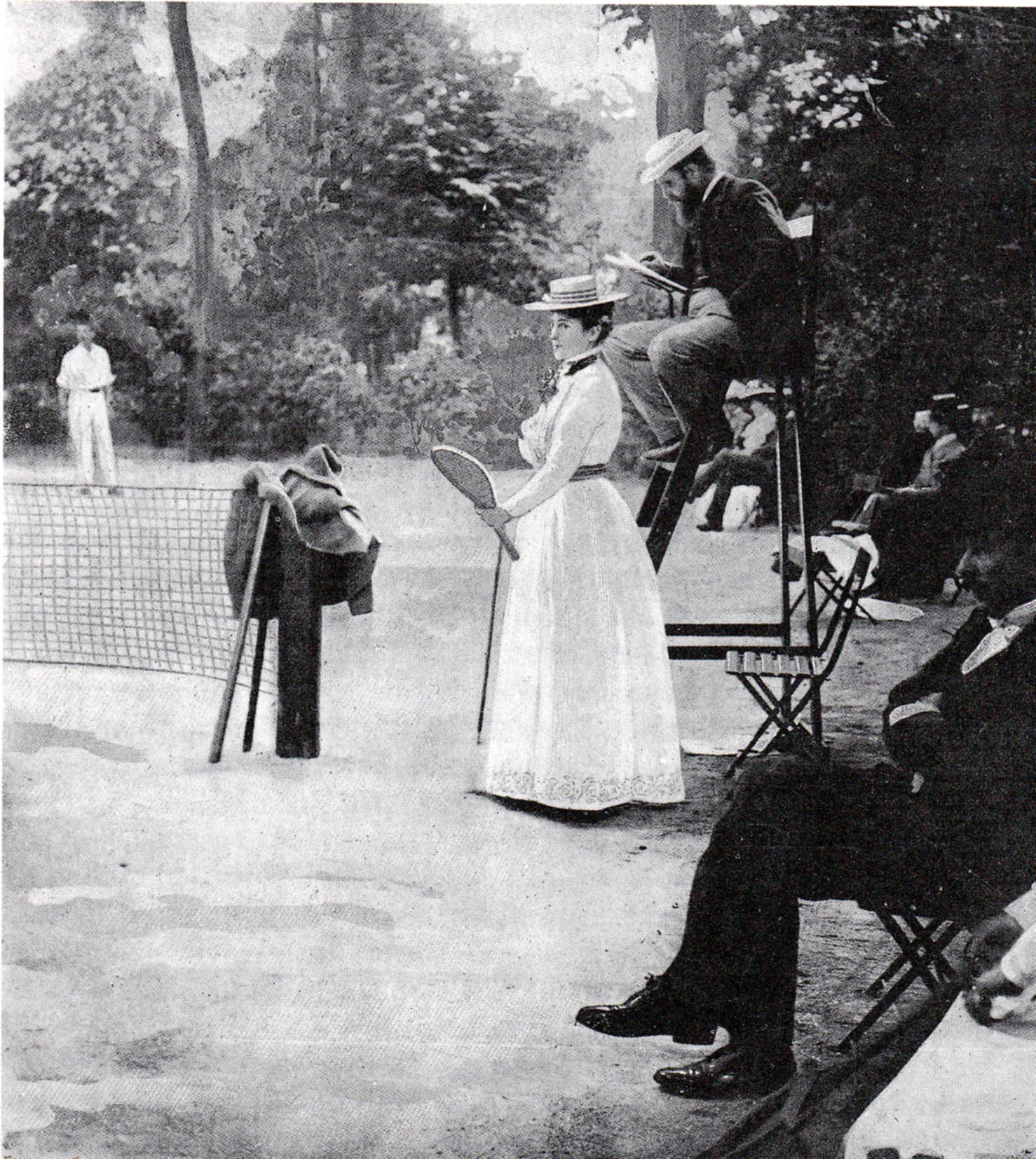
Women's tennis at the 1900 Paris Olympics

Paris played a central role in the organization of international sports and in the professionalization of sports. The first efforts to revive the Olympic Games were led by a French educator and historian, Pierre de Coubertin. The first meeting to organize the games took place at the Sorbonne in 1894, resulting in the creation of the International Olympic Committee and the holding of the first modern Olympic Games in Athens in 1896. The second games, the first Olympics held outside of Greece, were the 1900 Summer Olympics in Paris, from 14 May until 28 October 1900, organized in conjunction with the Paris Universal Exposition of 1900. There were 19 sports included in the event, and women competed in the Olympics for the first time. The swimming events took place in the Seine. Some of the sports were unusual by modern standards; they included automobile and motorcycle racing, cricket, croquet, underwater swimming, tug-of-war, and shooting live pigeons.

Cycling also became an important professional sport, with the opening in 1903 of the first cycling stadium, the Vélodrome d'hiver, on the site of the demolished Palace of Machinery from the 1900 Exposition on the Champ de Mars. The first stadium was demolished and moved in 1910 to boulevard de Grenelle. The first Tour de France, the most famous of all French cycling events, took place in 1903, with the finish line at the Parc des Princes stadium.

In September 1901, Paris hosted the first European lawn tennis championship in 1901, and on June 1, 1912, hosted the first world championship of tennis, at the stadium of the Faisanderie in the Domaine national de Saint-Cloud.

The first championship of France in football took place in 1894, with six teams competing. It was won by the team Standard Athletic Club of Paris; the team had one French player and ten British players. The first rugby match between England and France took place on 26 March 1906 at the Parc des Princes, with the victory of England.

Paris also hosted several of the world's earliest automobile races. The first, in 1894, was the Paris-Rouen race, organized by the newspaper Le Petit Journal. The first Paris-Bordeaux race took place on 10–12 June 1895, and the first race from Paris to Monte-Carlo in 1911.

== Science and technology ==
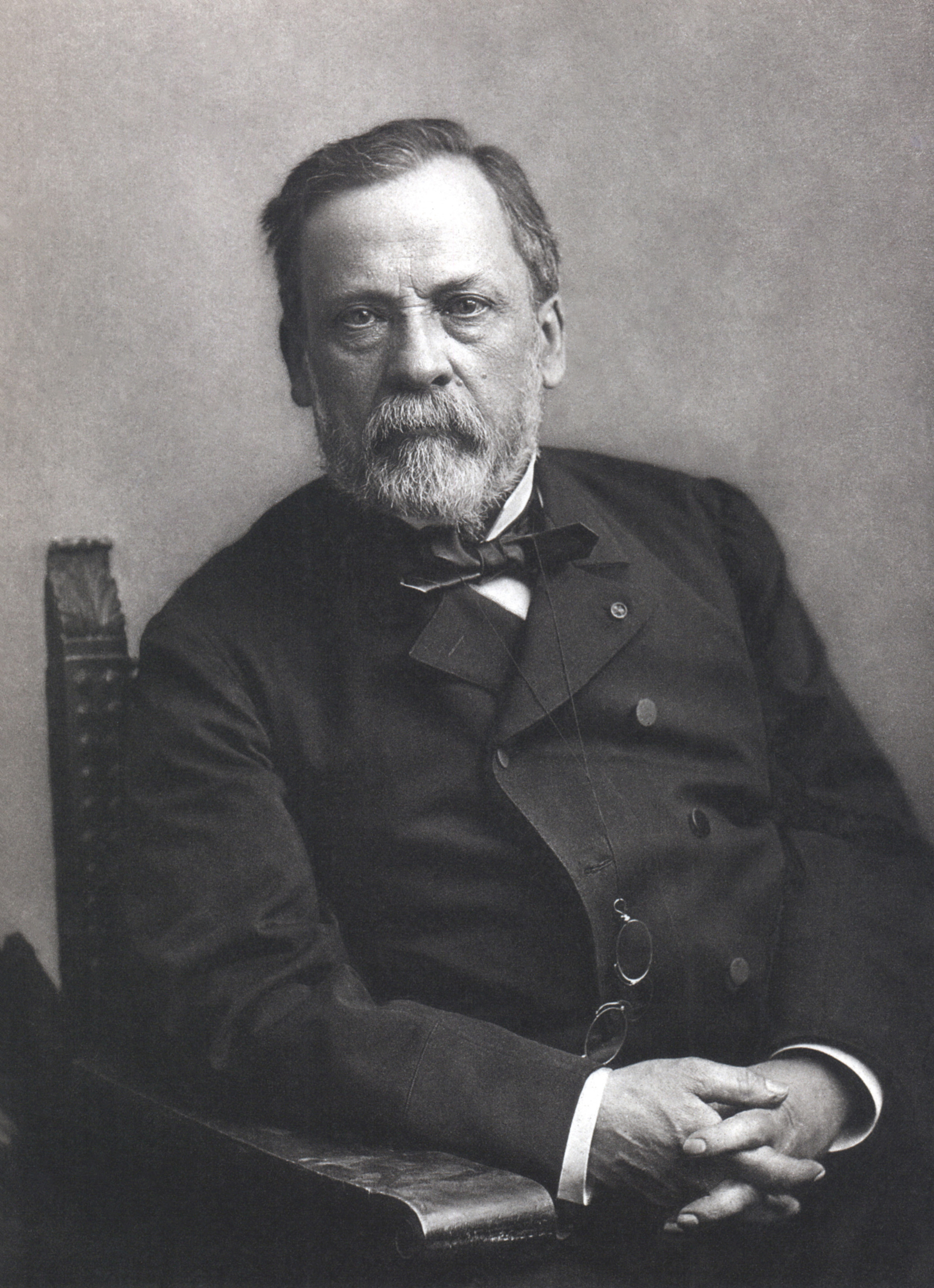
Louis Pasteur

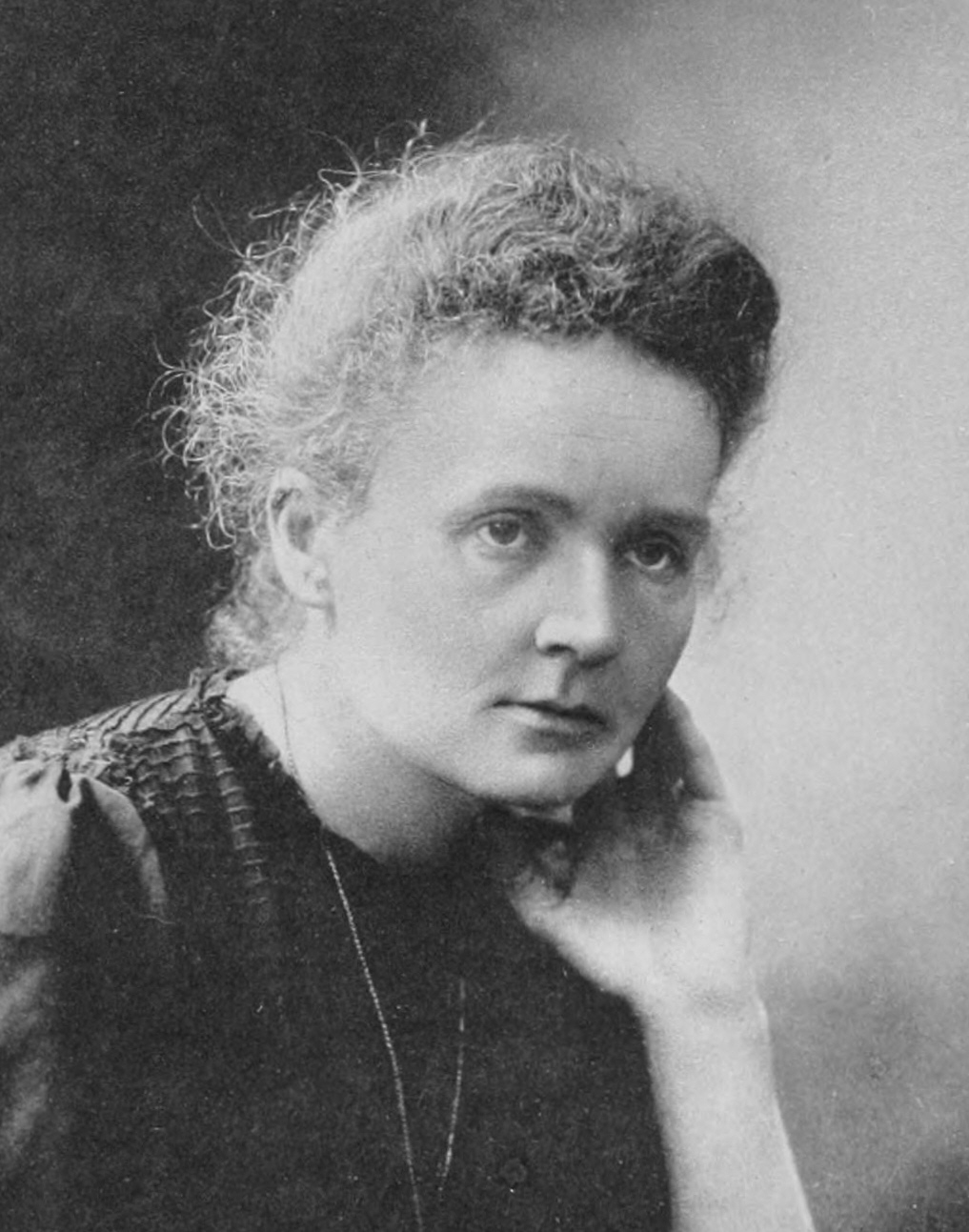
Marie Curie (1911)

Scientists in Paris played a leading role in many of major scientific developments of the period, particularly in bacteriology and physics. Louis Pasteur (1822-1895) was a pioneer in vaccination, microbacterial fermentation and pasteurization. He developed the first vaccines against anthrax (1881) and rabies (1885), and the process for stopping bacterial growth in milk and wine. He founded the Pasteur Institute in 1888 to carry on his work, and his tomb is located at the institute.

The physicist Henri Becquerel (1852-1908), while studying the fluorescence of uranium salts, discovered radioactivity in 1896, and in 1903 was awarded the Nobel Prize in physics for his discovery. Pierre Curie (1859-1906) and Marie Curie (1867-1934) jointly carried on Becquerel's work, discovering radium and polonium (1898). They jointly received the Nobel Prize for physics in 1903. Marie Curie became the first female professor at the University of Paris and won the Nobel Prize for chemistry in 1911. She was the first woman to be buried in the Panthéon.

The neon light was used for the first time in Paris on 3 December 1910 in the Grand Palais. The first outdoor neon advertising sign was put up on Boulevard Montmartre in 1912.

== The arts ==
=== Literature ===
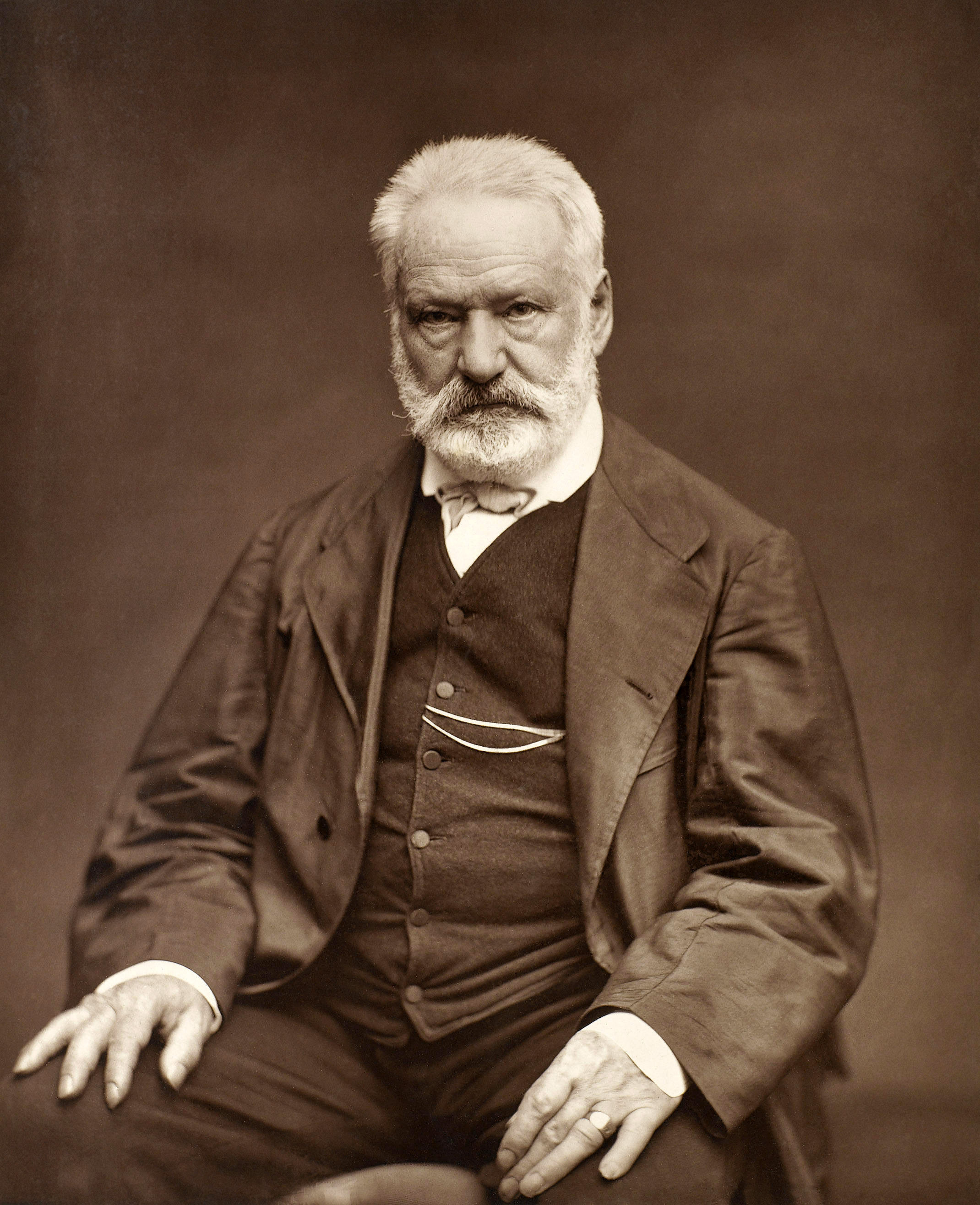
Victor Hugo (1876)

During the Belle Époque, Paris was the home and inspiration for some of France's most famous writers. Victor Hugo was sixty-eight when he returned to Paris from Brussels in 1871 and took up residence on the Avenue d'Eylau (now Avenue Victor Hugo) in the 16th arrondissement. He failed to be re-elected to the National Assembly, but in 1876, he was elected to the French Senate. It was a difficult period for Hugo; his daughter Adèle was placed in an insane asylum, and his longtime mistress, Juliette Drouet, died in 1883. When Hugo died 28 May 1885 at the age of eighty-three, hundreds of thousands of Parisians lined the streets to pay tribute as his coffin was taken to the Panthéon on 1 June 1885.

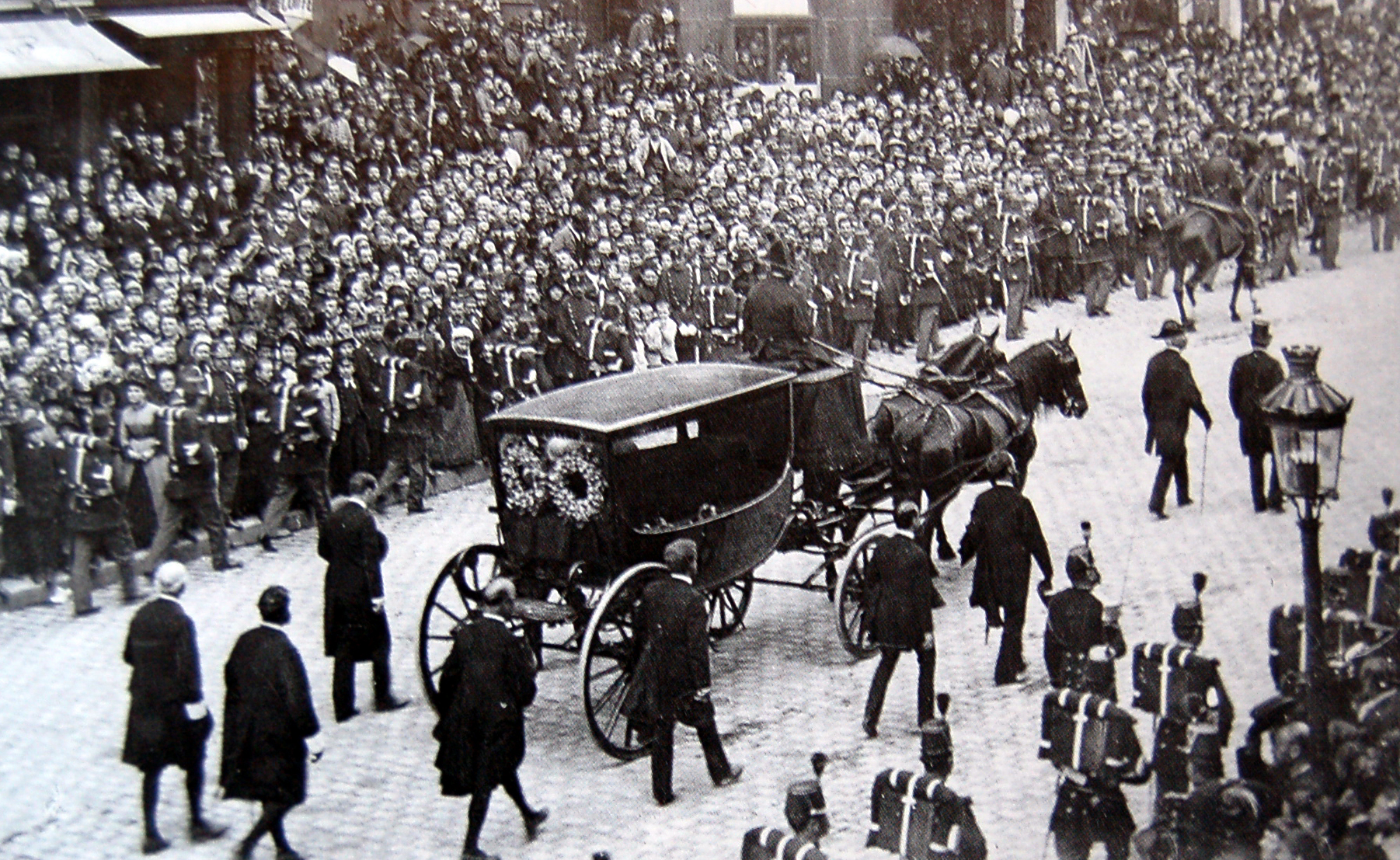
On 1 June 1885, crowds line the streets of Paris as Victor Hugo's remains are taken to the Panthéon.

Émile Zola was born in Paris in 1840, the son of an Italian engineer. He was raised by his mother in Aix-en-Provence, then returned to Paris in 1858 with his friend Paul Cézanne to attempt a literary career. He worked as a mailing clerk for the publisher Hachette and began attracting literary attention in 1865 with his novels in the new style of naturalism. He described in intimate details the workings of Paris department stores, markets, apartment buildings and other institutions, and the lives of the Parisians. By 1877, he had become famous and wealthy from his writing. He took a central role in the Dreyfus affair, helping win justice for Alfred Dreyfus, a French artillery officer of Alsatian Jewish background, who had falsely been accused of treason.

Guy de Maupassant (1850-1893) moved to Paris in 1881 and worked as a clerk for the French Navy, then for the Ministry of Public Education, as he wrote short stories and novels at a furious pace. He became famous, but also became ill and depressed, then paranoid and suicidal. He died at the asylum of Saint-Esprit in Passy in 1893.

Other writers who made a mark in the Paris literary world of the Third Republic's Belle Époque included Anatole France (1844-1924); Paul Claudel (1868-1955); Alphonse Allais (1854-1905); Guillaume Apollinaire (1880-1918); Maurice Barrès (1862-1923); René Bazin (1853-1932); Colette (1873-1954); François Coppée (1842-1908); Alphonse Daudet (1840-1897); Alain Fournier (1886-1914); André Gide (1869-1951); Pierre Louÿs (1870-1925); Maurice Maeterlinck (1862-1949); Stéphane Mallarmé (1840-1898); Octave Mirbeau (1848-1917); Anna de Noailles (1876-1933); Charles Péguy (1873-1914); Marcel Proust (1871-1922); Jules Renard (1864-1910); Arthur Rimbaud (1854-1891); Romain Rolland (1866-1944); Edmond Rostand (1868-1918); and Paul Verlaine (1844-1890). Paris was also the home of one of the greatest Russian writers of the period, Ivan Turgenev.

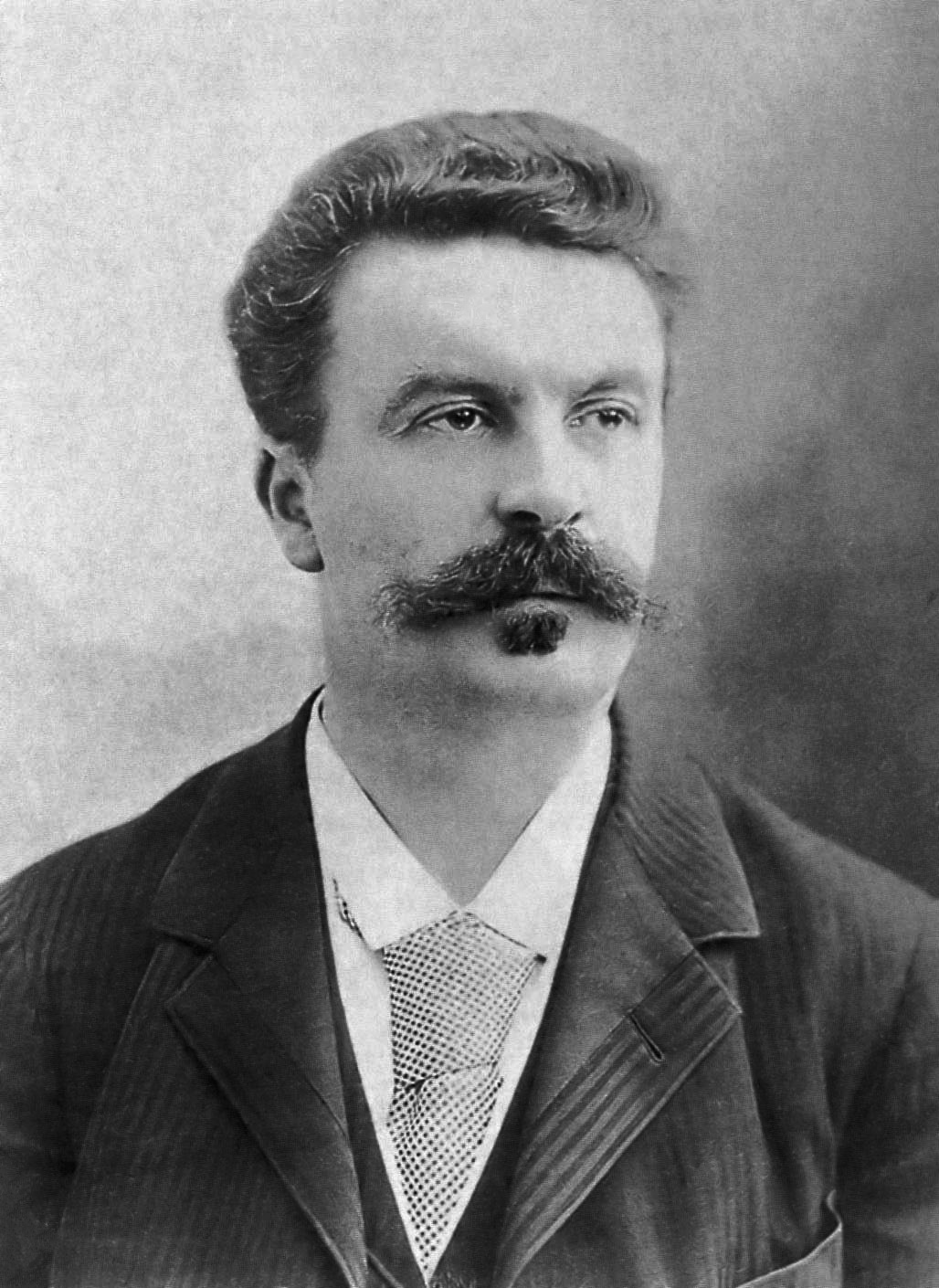
Guy de Maupassant (1888)

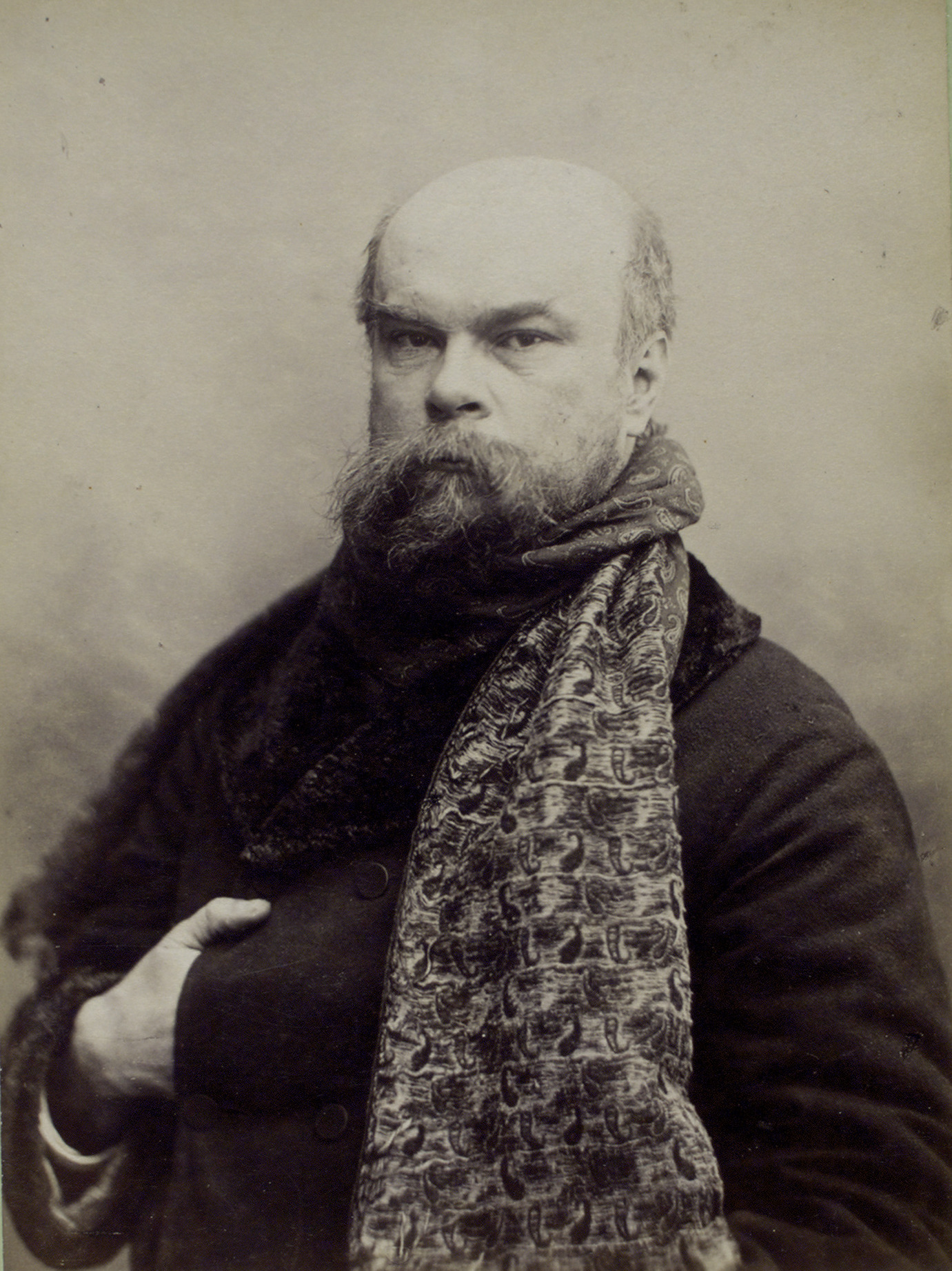
Paul Verlaine (1893)

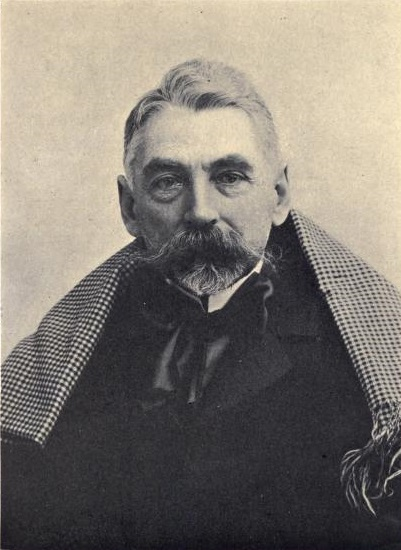
Stéphane Mallarmé (1896)

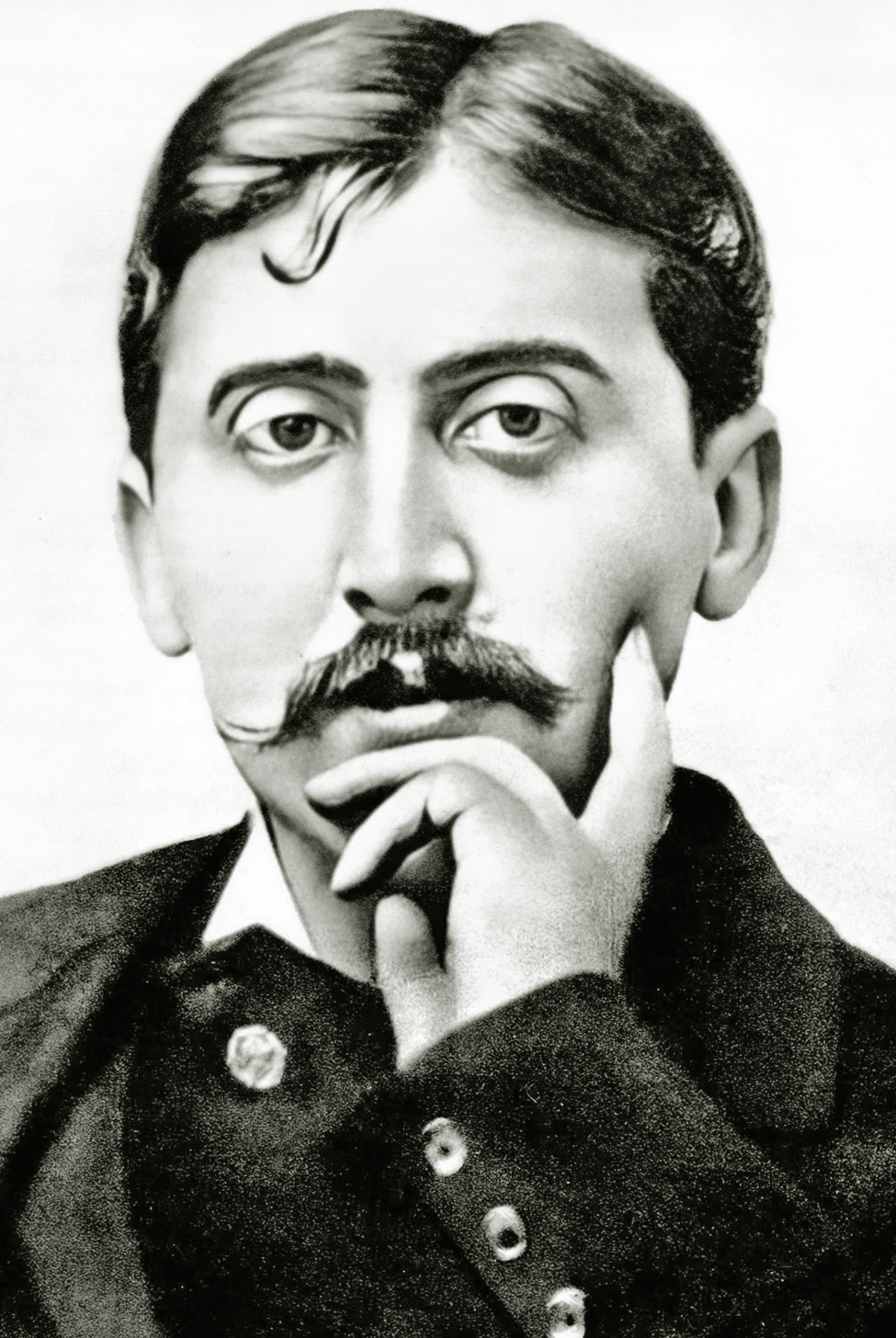
Marcel Proust (1900)

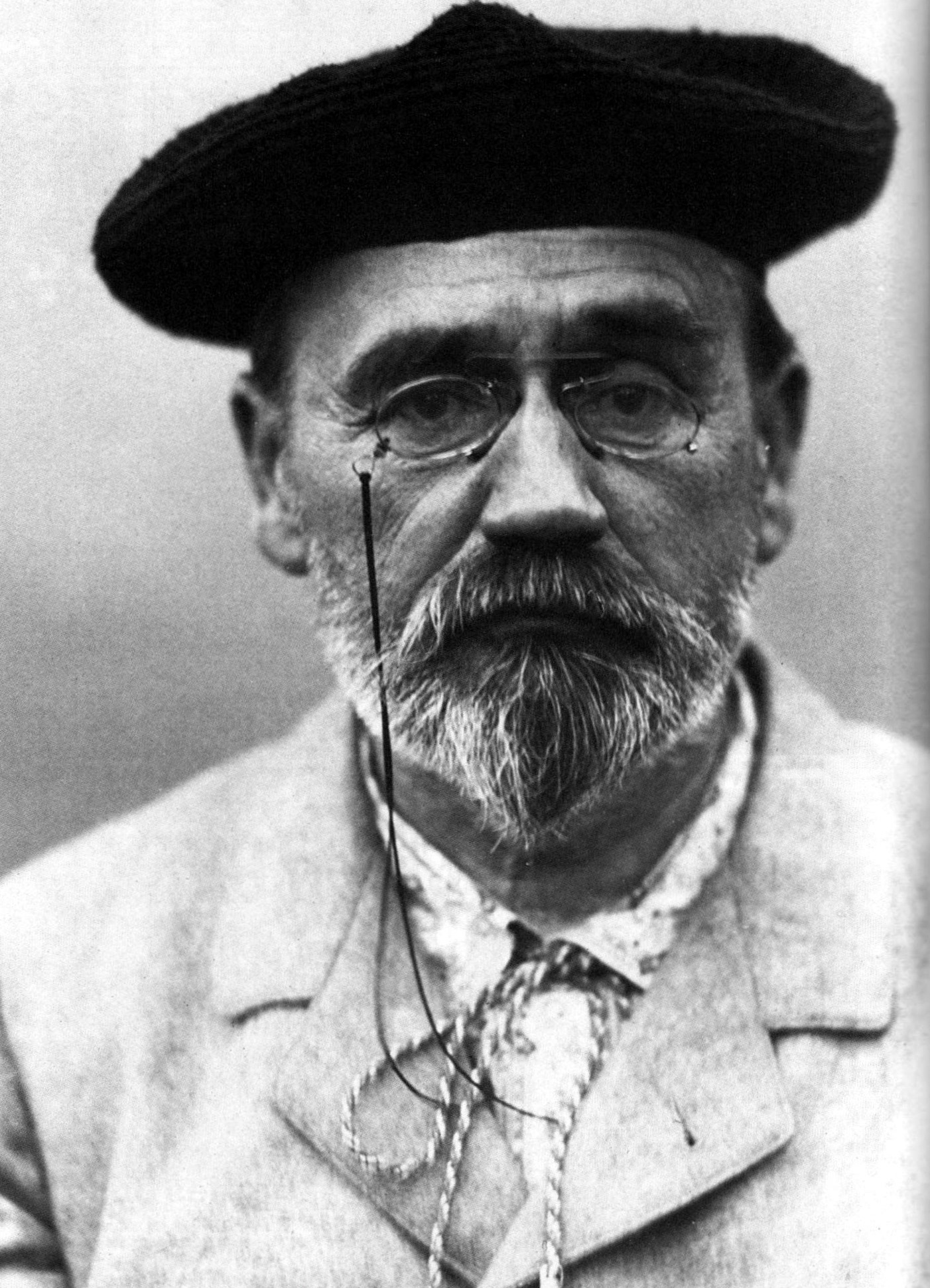
Emile Zola (1902)

=== Music ===
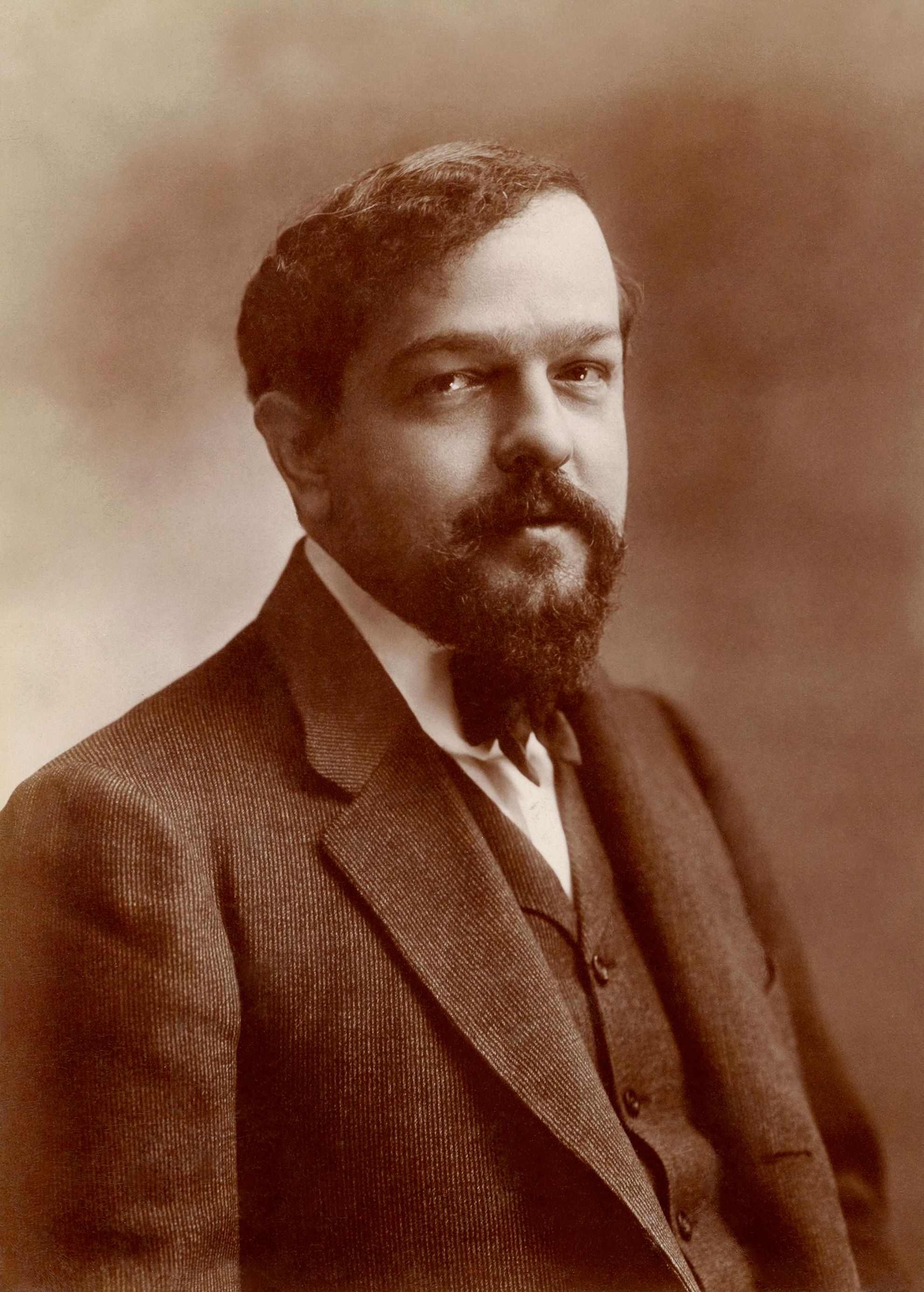
Claude Debussy (1908)

Paris composers during the period had a major impact on European music, moving it away from romanticism toward impressionism in music and modernism.

Camille Saint-Saëns (1835-1921) was born in Paris and admitted to the Paris Conservatory when he was thirteen. When he finished the Conservatory, he became organist at the church of Saint-Merri, and later at La Madeleine. His most famous works included the Danse Macabre, the opera Samson et Dalila (1877), the Carnival of the Animals (1877), and his Symphony No. 3 (1886). On 25 February 1871, he co-founded the Société Nationale de Musique with Romain Bussine to promote French contemporary and chamber music. His students included Maurice Ravel and Gabriel Fauré, two of the foremost French composers of the late 19th- and early 20th centuries.

Georges Bizet (1838-1875), born in Paris, was admitted to the Paris Conservatory when he was only ten years old. He finished his most famous work, Carmen, written for the Opéra-Comique, in 1874. Even before its première, Carmen was criticized as immoral. Furthermore, the musicians complained that it could not be played, and the singers complained that it could not be sung. The reviews were mixed, and the audience cold. When Bizet died in 1875, he considered it a failure. Nonetheless, Carmen soon became one of the best-known and beloved operas in the repertoire worldwide.

The most famous French composer of the late Belle Époque in Paris was Claude Debussy (1862-1918). He was born at Saint-Germain-en-Laye, near Paris, and entered the Conservatory in 1872. He became part of the Parisian literary circle of the symbolist poet Mallarme. At first an admirer of Richard Wagner, he went on to experiment with impressionism in music, atonal music and chromaticism. His most famous works include Clair de Lune for piano (written ca. 1890, published 1905), La Mer for orchestra (1905) and the opera Pelléas et Mélisande (1903-1905).

The most revolutionary composer to work in Paris during the Belle Époque was the Russian-born Igor Stravinsky. He first achieved international fame with three ballets commissioned by the impresario Sergei Diaghilev and first performed in Paris by Diaghilev's Ballets Russes: The Firebird (1910), Petrushka (1911) and The Rite of Spring (1913). The last of these transformed the way in which subsequent composers thought about rhythmic structure and dissonance treatment.

Other influential composers in Paris during the period included Jules Massenet (1842-1912), author of the operas Manon and Werther, and Eric Satie (1866-1925), who made his living as a pianist at Le Chat Noir, a cabaret on Montmartre, after leaving the Conservatory. His most famous works are the Gymnopédies (1888).

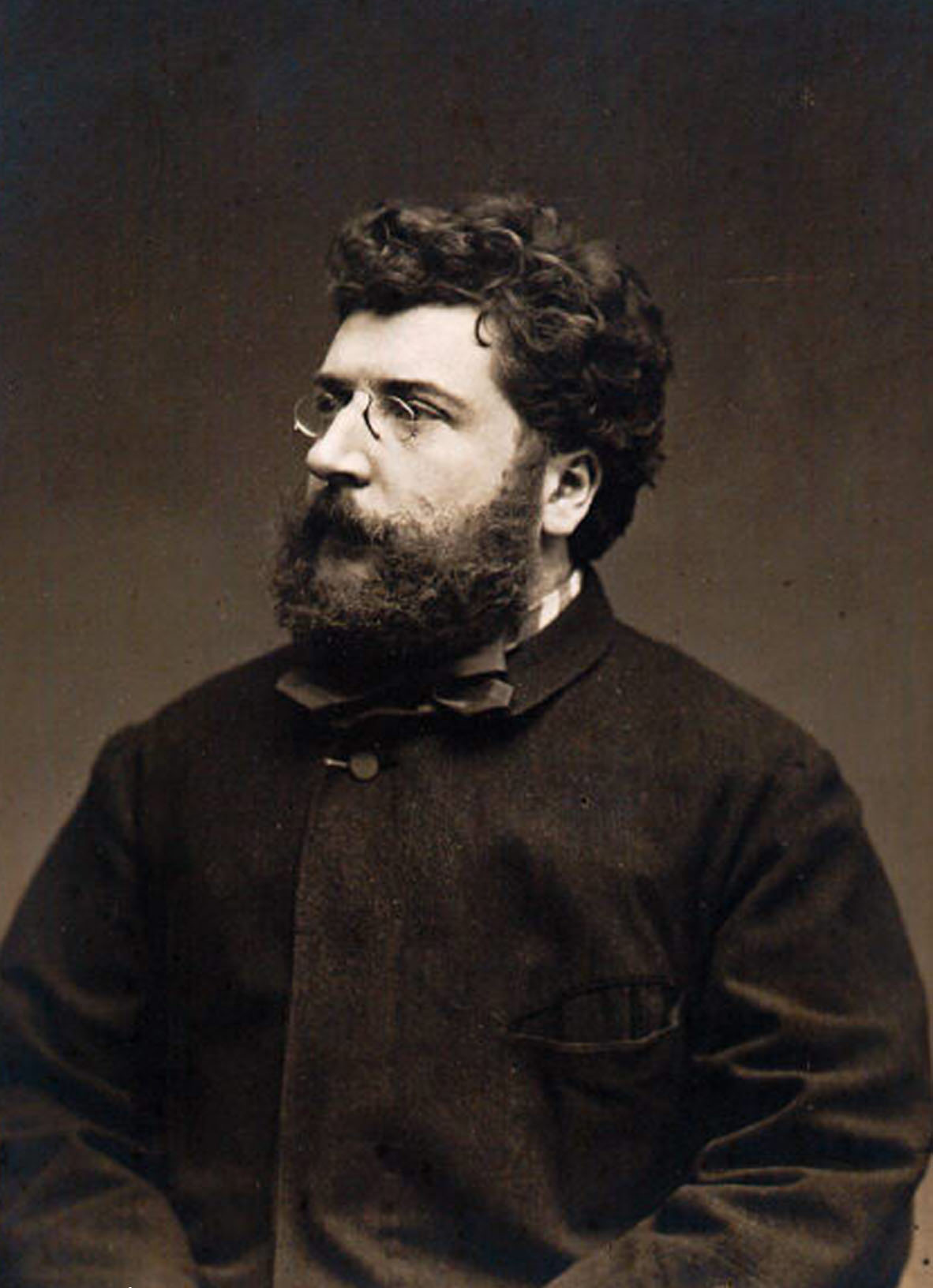
Georges Bizet (1875)

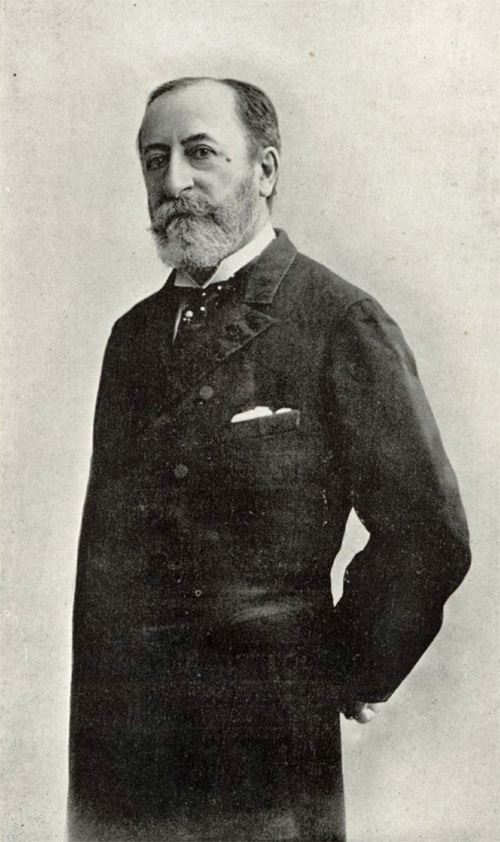
Camille Saint-Saëns (about 1880)

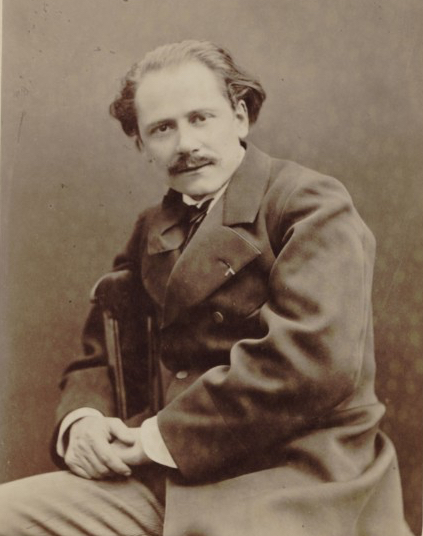
Jules Massenet (1880)

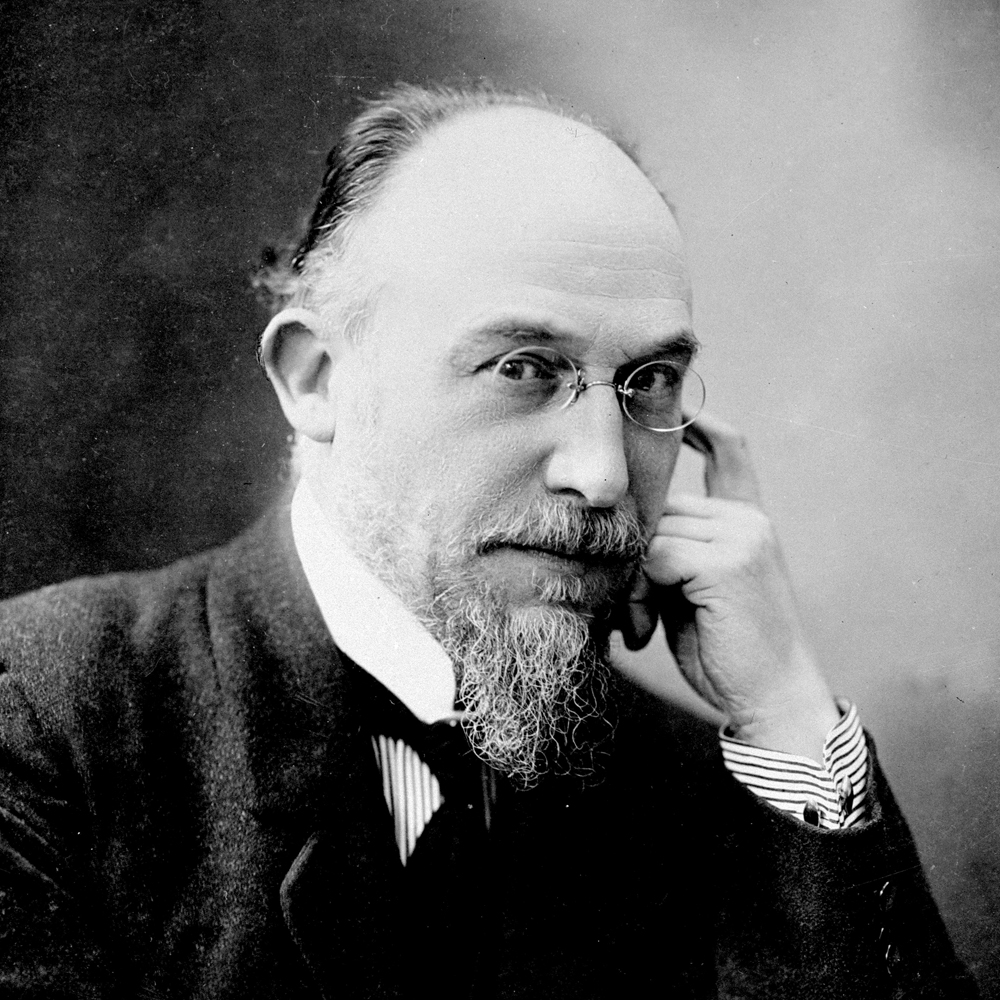
Eric Satie

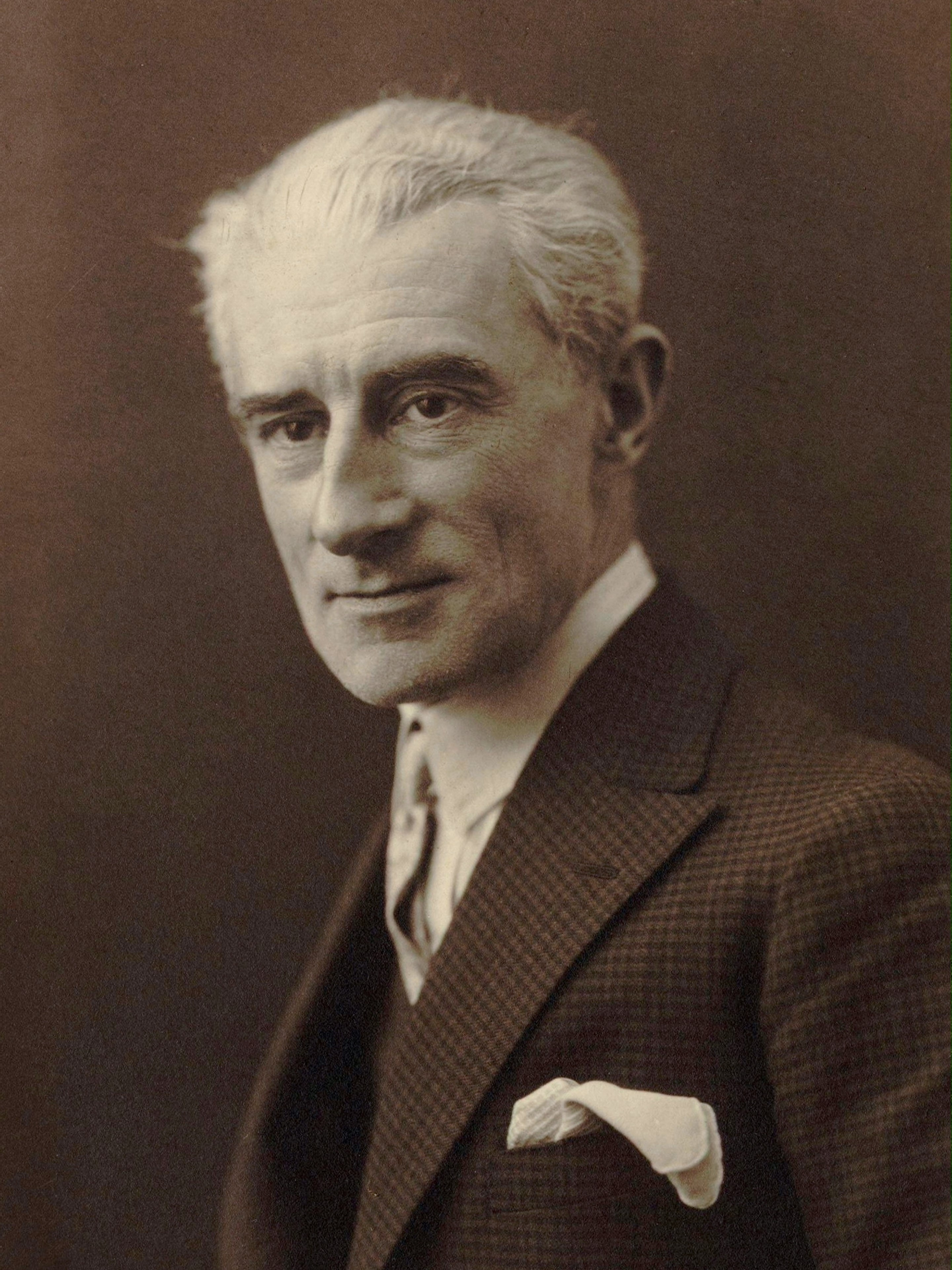
Maurice Ravel

Igor Stravinsky, as drawn by Picasso (1920)

=== Painting ===
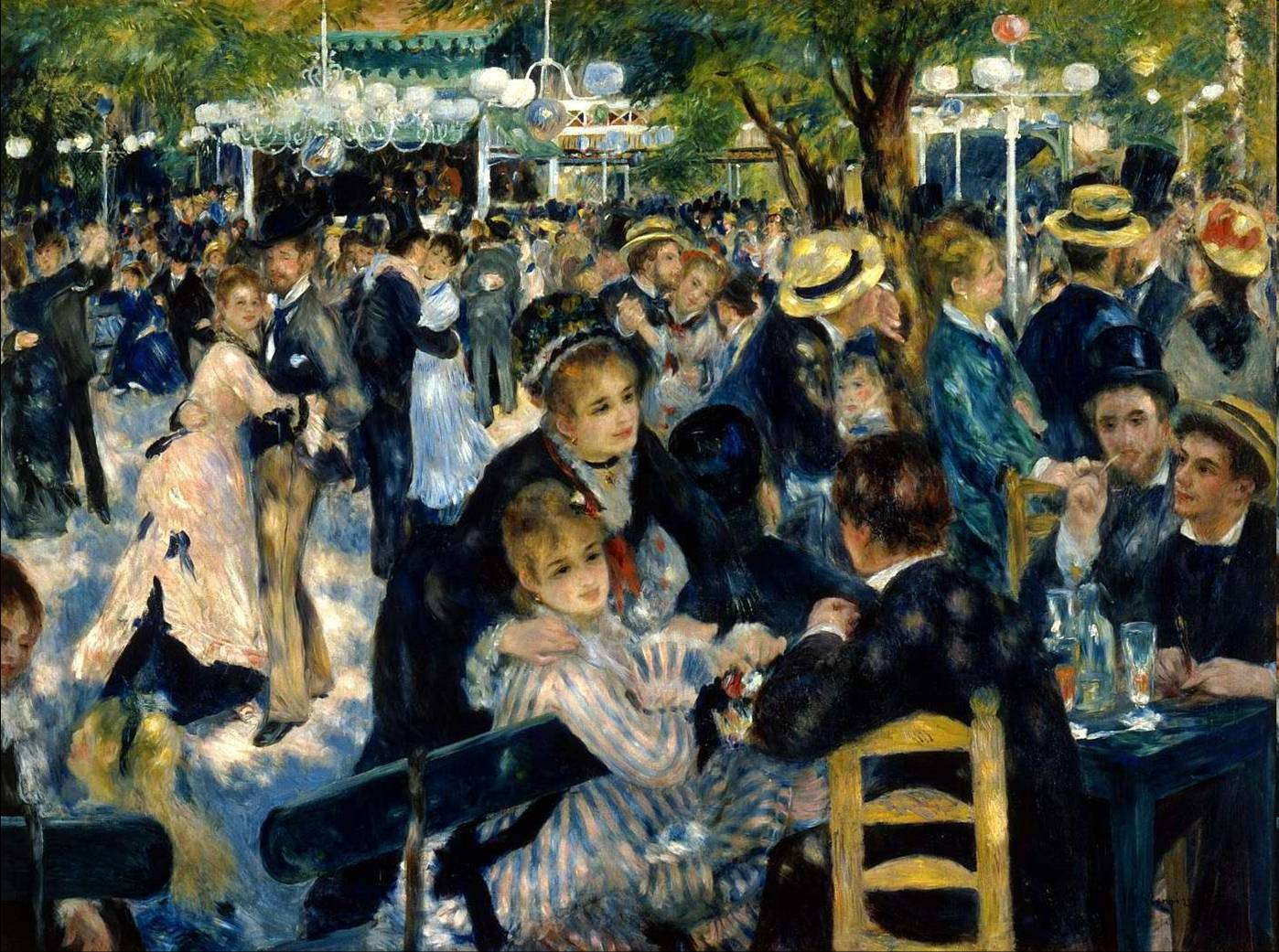
The Bal du moulin de la Galette by Pierre-Auguste Renoir (1876) depicts a Sunday afternoon dance in Montmartre. Paris became the birthplace of Impressionism and modern art during the Belle Époque.

Paris was the home and the frequent subject of the Impressionists, who tried to capture the city's light, its colors, and its motion. They survived and flourished because of the support of Paris art dealers, such as Ambroise Vollard and Daniel-Henry Kahnweiler, and wealthy patrons, including Gertrude Stein.

The first exhibit of the Impressionists took place from April 15 to May 15, 1874 in the studio of the photographer Nadar. It was open to any painter who could pay a fee of sixty francs. There, Claude Monet exhibited the painting Impression: Sunrise (Impression, soleil levant), which gave the movement its name. Other artists who took part included Pierre-Auguste Renoir, Berthe Morisot, Edgar Degas, Camille Pissarro, and Paul Cézanne.

Les Demoiselles d'Avignon painted by Picasso in Montmartre (1907)

Henri de Toulouse-Lautrec (1864-1901) spent much of his short life in Montmartre painting and drawing the dancers in cabarets. He produced 737 canvases in his lifetime, thousands of drawings and a series of posters made for the cabaret Moulin Rouge. Many other artists lived and worked in Montmartre, where rent was low and the atmosphere congenial. In 1876, Auguste Renoir rented space at 12 Rue Cartot to paint his Bal du moulin de la Galette, which depicts a popular ball at Montmartre on a Sunday afternoon. Maurice Utrillo lived at the same address from 1906 to 1914, Suzanne Valadon lived and had her studio there, and Raoul Dufy shared an atelier there from 1901 to 1911. The building is now the Musée de Montmartre.

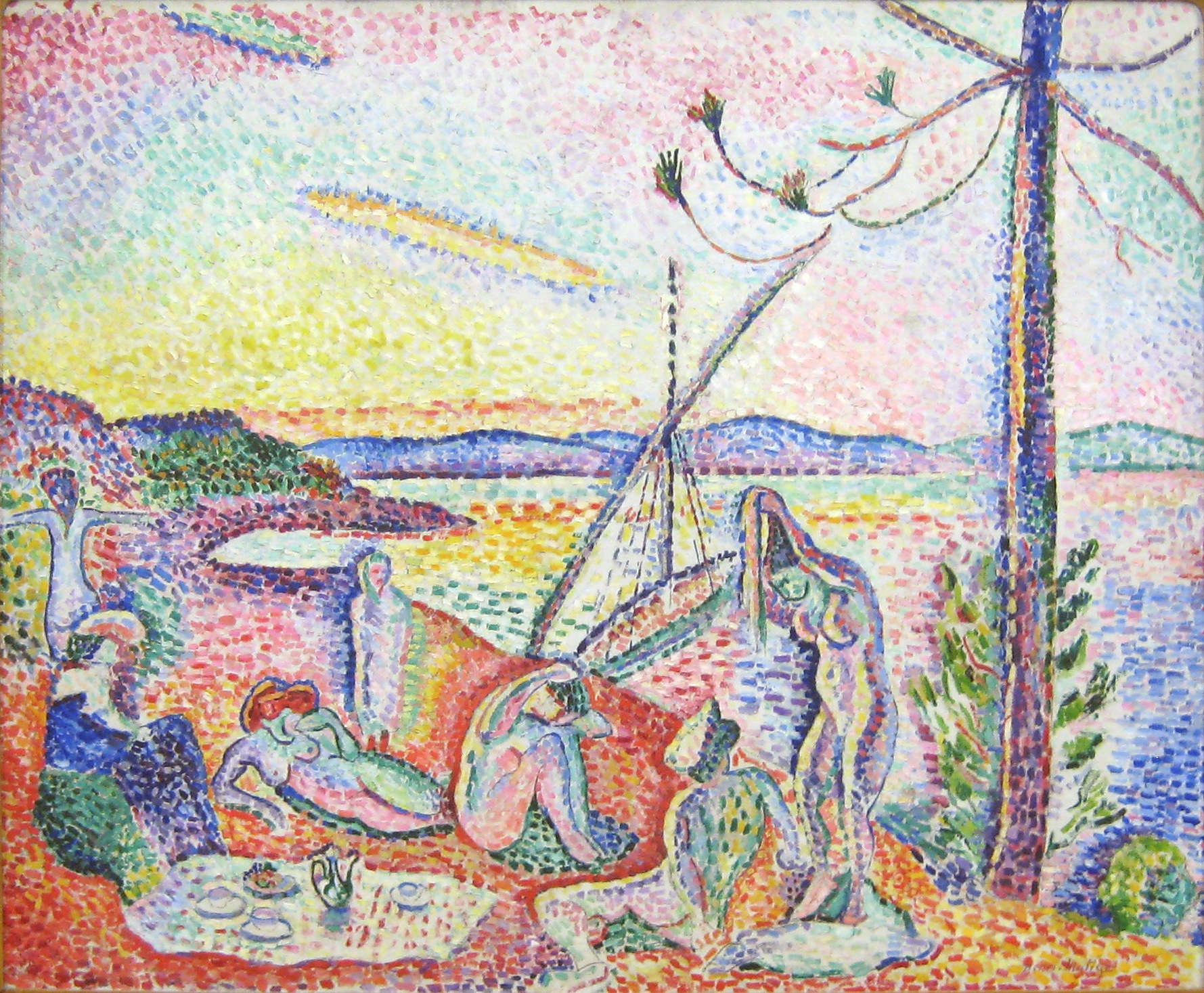
Luxe, Calme, et Volupté by Henri Matisse (1904)

A new generation of artists arrived in Montmartre at the turn of the century. Drawn by the reputation of Paris as the world capital of art, Pablo Picasso came from Barcelona in 1900 to share an apartment with the poet Max Jacob and began by painting the cabarets and prostitutes of the neighborhood. Amedeo Modigliani and other artists lived and worked in a building called Le Bateau-Lavoir during the years 1904–1909. In 1907, Picasso painted one of his most important masterpieces, Les Demoiselles d'Avignon, in Le Bateau-Lavoir. Led by Picasso and Georges Braque, the artistic movement Cubism was born in Paris.

Henri Matisse came to Paris in 1891 to study at the Académie Julian in the class of painter Gustave Moreau, who advised him to copy paintings in the Louvre and study Islamic art, which Matisse did. He also made the acquaintance of Raoul Dufy, Cézanne, Georges Rouault and Paul Gauguin, and began to paint in the style of Cézanne. Matisse visited Saint-Tropez in 1905, and when he returned to Paris, he painted a revolutionary work, Luxe, Calme et Volupté, using bright colors and bold dabs of paint. Matisse and artists such as André Derain, Raoul Dufy, Jean Metzinger, Maurice de Vlaminck and Charles Camoin revolutionized the Paris art world with "wild", multi-colored, expressive landscapes and figure paintings that the critics called Fauvism. Henri Matisse's two versions of The Dance (1909) signified a key point in the development of modern painting.

The Paris Salon, which had established the reputations and measured the success of painters throughout the Second Empire, continued to take place under the Third Republic until 1881, when a more radical French government denied it official sponsorship. It was replaced by a new Salon sponsored by the Société des Artistes Français. In December 1890, the leader of the society, William-Adolphe Bouguereau, propagated the idea that the new Salon should be an exhibition of young, yet not awarded, artists. Ernest Meissonier, Puvis de Chavannes, Auguste Rodin and others rejected this proposal and made a secession. They created the Société Nationale des Beaux-Arts and its own exhibition, immediately referred to in the press as the Salon du Champ de Mars or the Salon de la Société Nationale des Beaux–Arts; it was soon also widely known as the "Nationale". In 1903, in response to what many artists at the time felt was a bureaucratic and conservative organization, a group of painters and sculptors led by Pierre-Auguste Renoir and Auguste Rodin organized the Salon d'Automne.

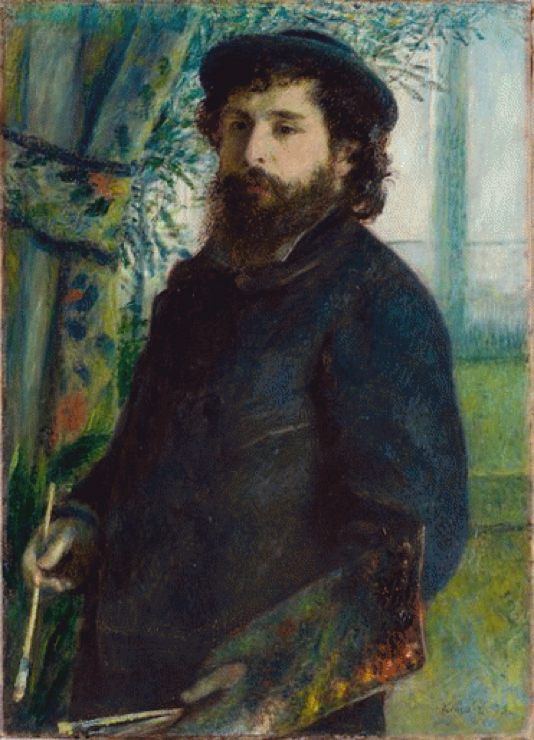
Portrait of the painter Claude Monet, Claude Monet as portrayed by Pierre-Auguste Renoir (1875)

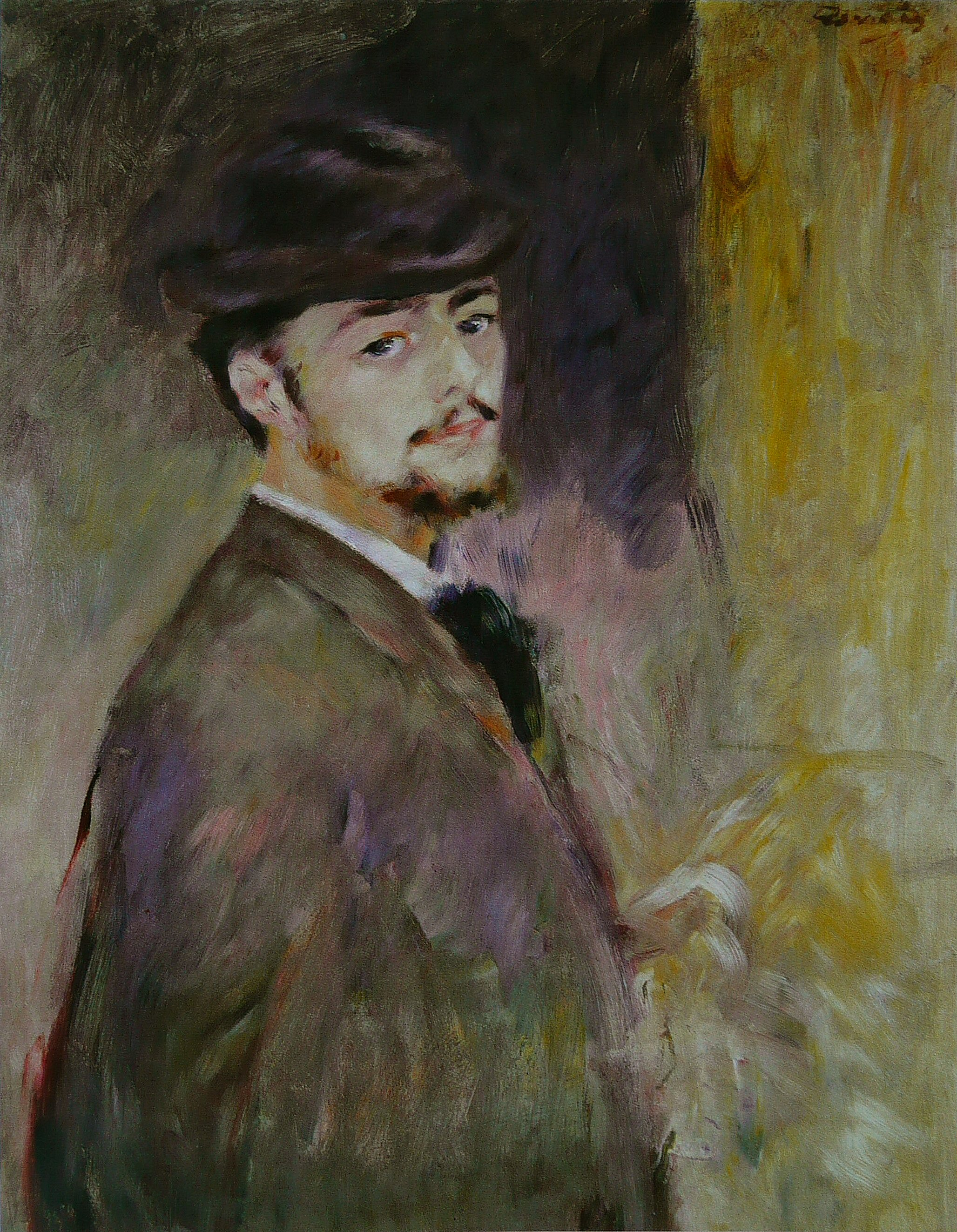
Self-portrait of Pierre-Auguste Renoir (1876)

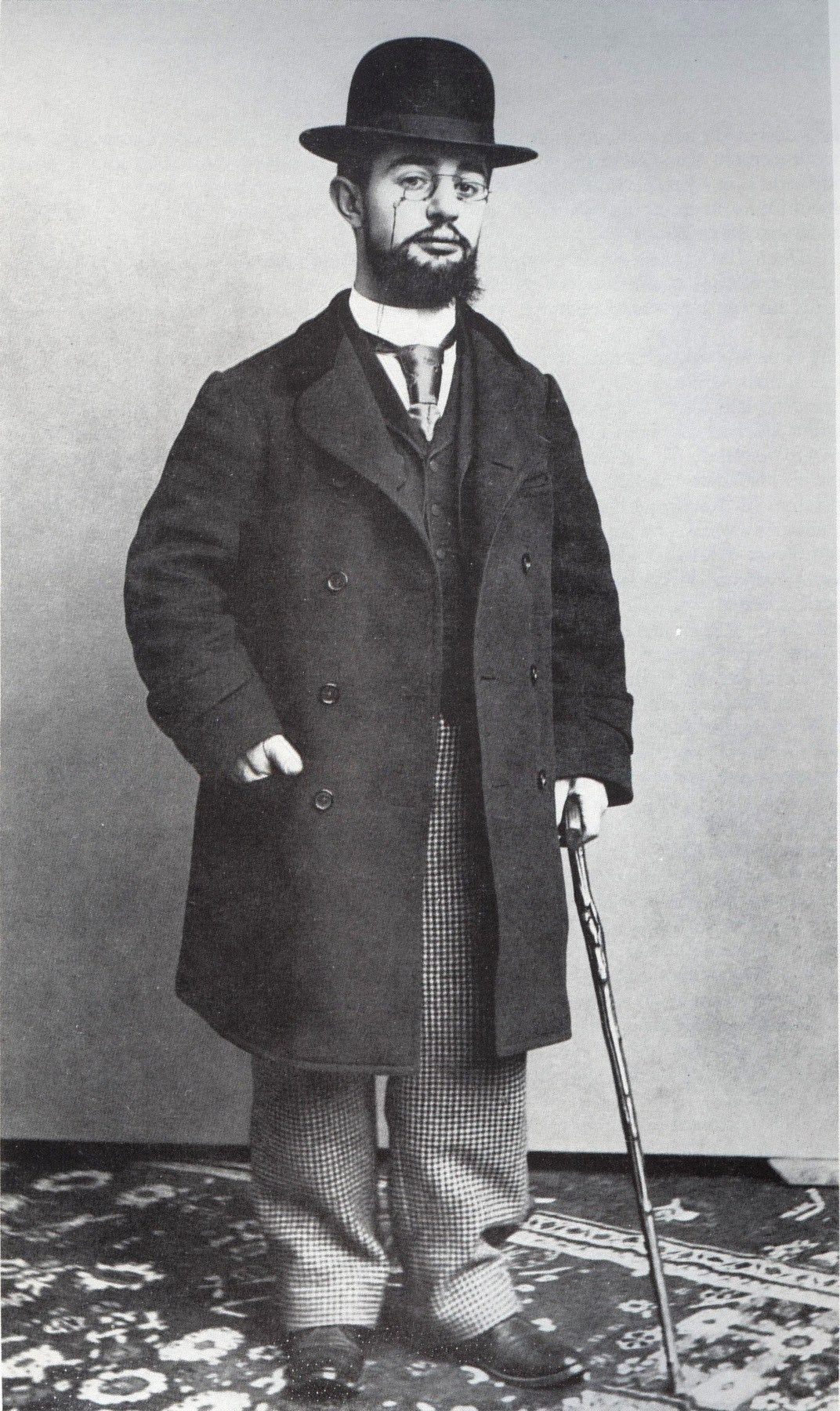
Henri de Toulouse-Lautrec

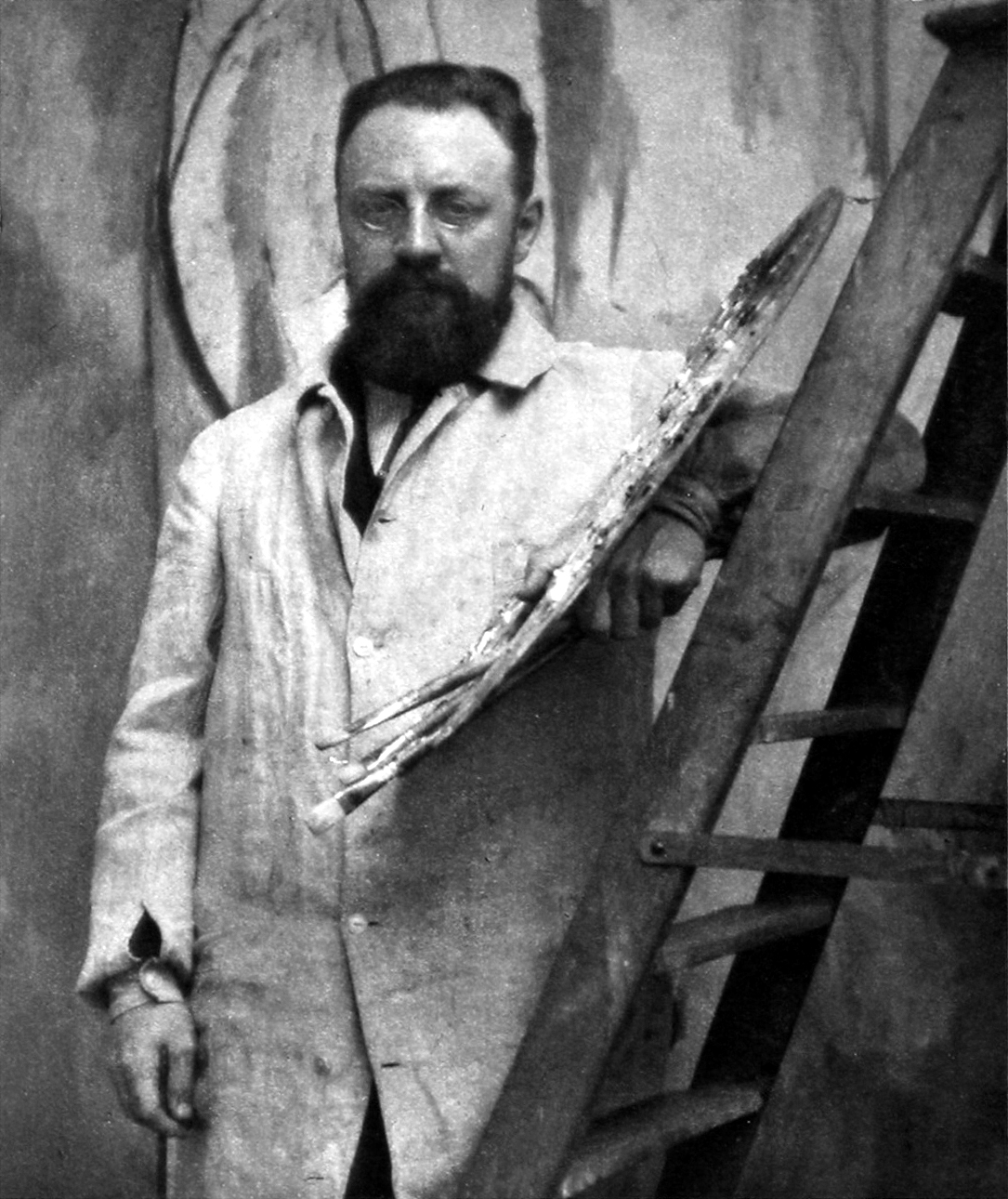
Henri Matisse (1913)

=== Sculpture ===
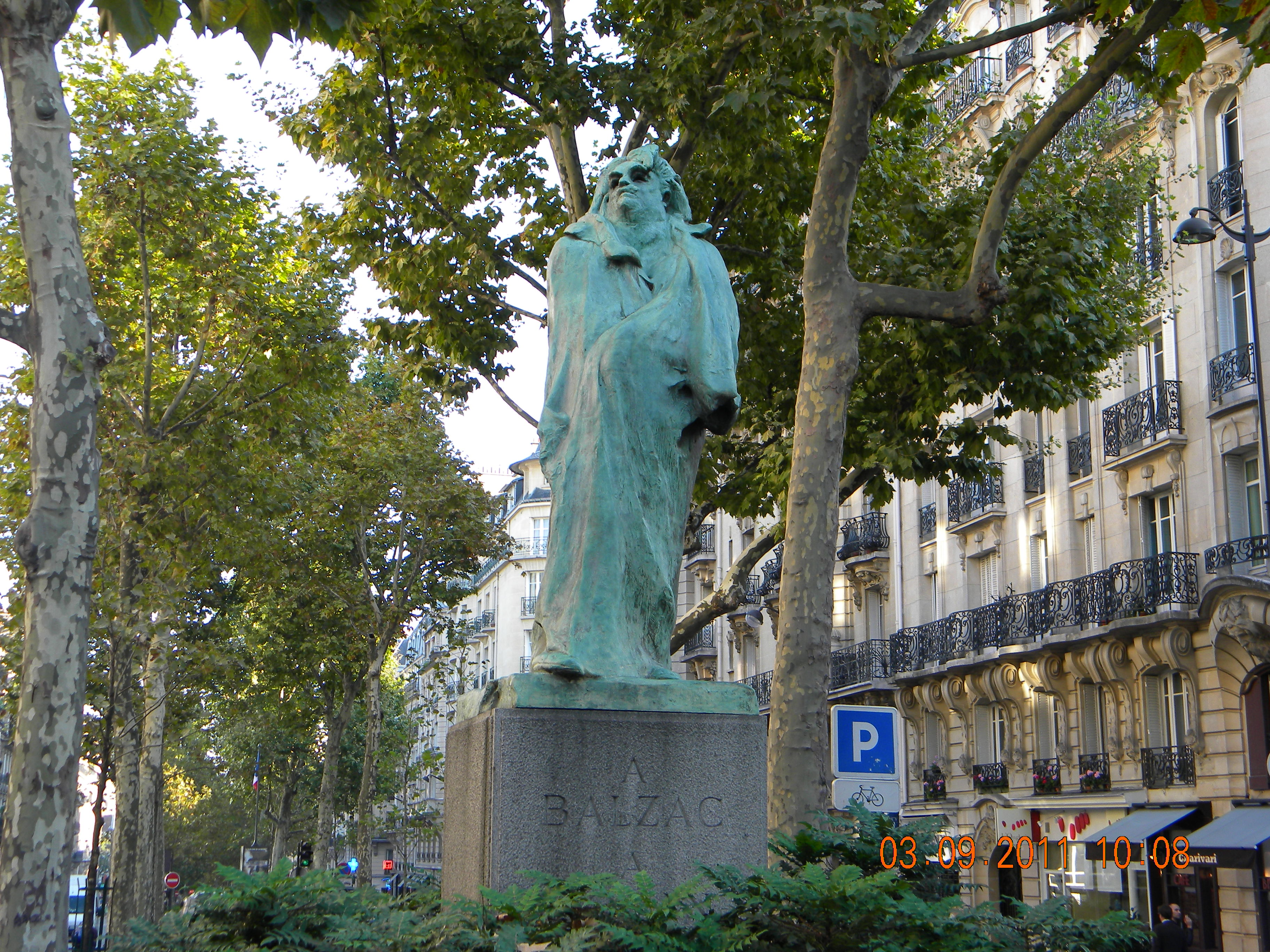
Monument to Balzac, by Auguste Rodin, on the Boulevard Raspail (1890)

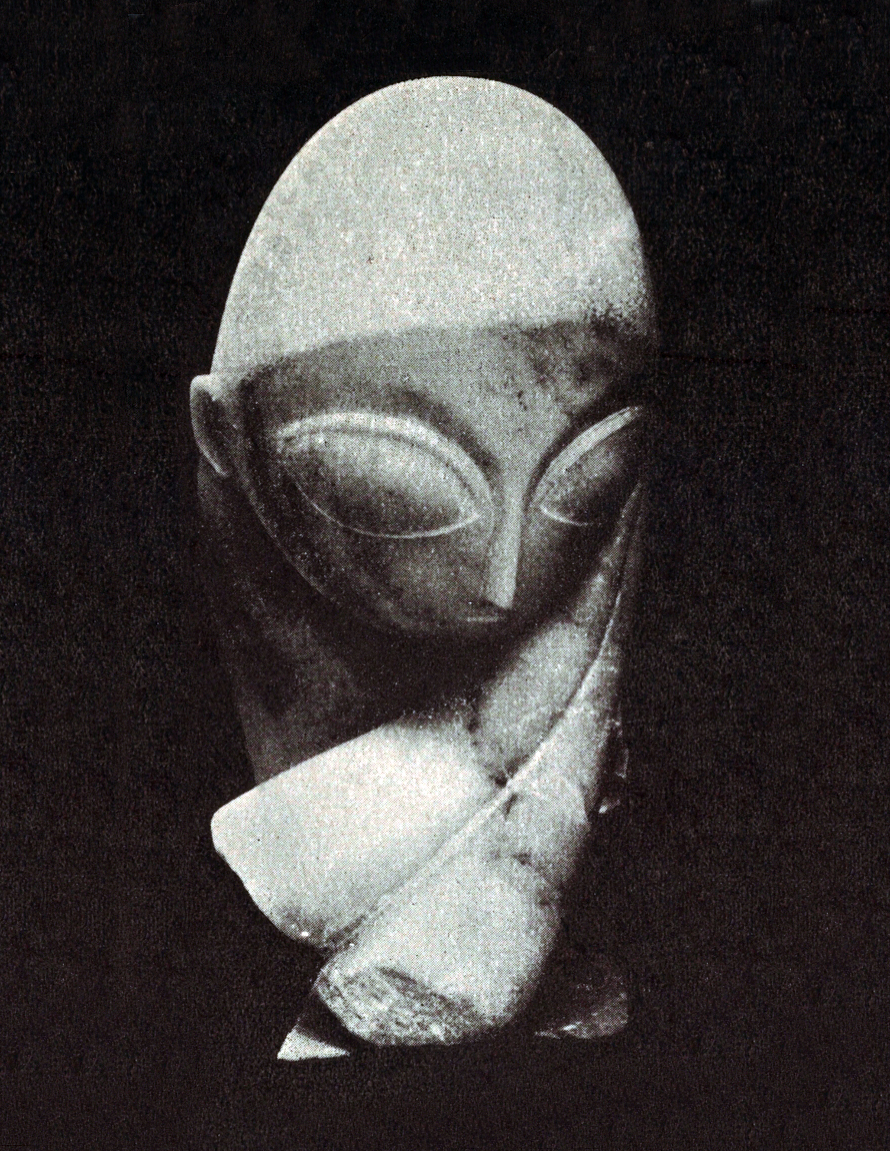
Constantin Brâncuși, Portrait of Mademoiselle Pogany, 1912 Philadelphia Museum of Art

The Belle Époque was a golden age for sculptors; the government of the Third Republic commissioned very few monumental buildings, but did commission a large number of statues to French writers, scientists, artists and political figures that soon filled the city's parks and squares. The most prominent sculptor of the period was Auguste Rodin (1840-1917). Born in Paris into a working-class family, he was rejected for entry into the École des Beaux-Arts and rejected by the Paris Salon. He had to struggle for many years to win recognition, supporting himself as a decorator and later as a designer for the Sèvres porcelain factory. He gradually won attention for his design for the Gates of Hell, a museum of decorative art which was never built; its plan included what became his most famous work, The Thinker. He was commissioned by the city of Calais to make a monument, The Burghers of Calais (1884), to commemorate an event that took place in that city in 1347, during the Hundred Years' War. He was also commissioned to create a Monument to Balzac (now on the Boulevard Raspail), which caused a scandal and made him a celebrity. Rodin's work was exhibited near the 1900 Exposition, which won him many foreign clients. In 1908, he moved from Meudon to Paris, renting the ground floor of a private mansion in the 7th arrondissement, the Hôtel Biron, now the Musée Rodin. By the time of his death, he was the most famous sculptor in France, perhaps in the world.

Other more traditional sculptors whose work won acclaim in Paris during the Belle Époque included Jules Dalou, Antoine Bourdelle (also a former assistant of Rodin), and Aristide Maillol. Their works decorated theaters, parks, and were featured at the International Expositions. The more avant-garde artists organized themselves into the Société des Artistes Indépendants. They held annual Salons that helped set the course of modern art. At the turn of the century, Paris attracted sculptors from around the world. Constantin Brâncuși (1876-1957) moved from Bucharest to Munich to Paris, where he was admitted, in 1905, to the École des Beaux-Arts. He worked for two months in the workshop of Rodin, but left, declaring that "Nothing grows under big trees", and went in his own direction into modernism. Brâncuși won fame at the 1913 "Salon des indépendants" and became one of the pioneers of modern sculpture.

== The flood of 1910 ==
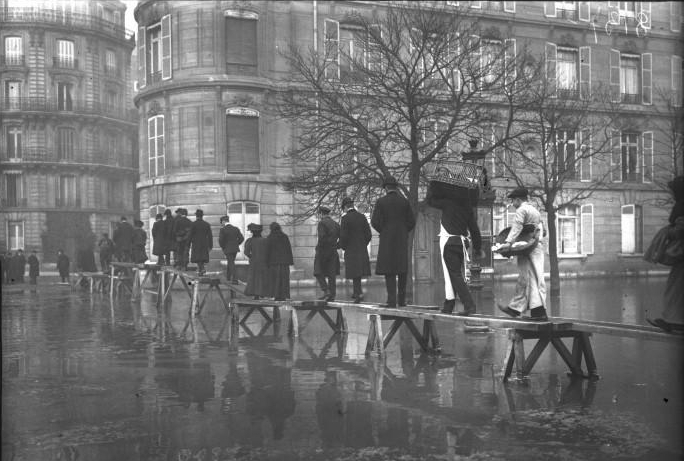
A footbridge over the Avenue Montaigne during the 1910 flood

The Paris flood of 1910 reached the height of 8.5 meters on the scale measuring the river's level on the Pont de la Tournelle. The Seine rose above its banks and flooded along the course it had followed in prehistoric times; the water reached as far as the Gare Saint-Lazare and the Place du Havre. It was the second-highest flood recorded in the history of Paris (the highest was in 1658), and was the third major flood of the Belle Époque (the others were in 1872 and 1876). Nonetheless, it received much more attention than earlier floods, largely because of the advent of photography and the international press. Postcards and other images of the flood spread around the world. The municipal authorities made a special survey of the city to measure exactly its extent. It also demonstrated the vulnerability of the city's new infrastructure: the flood stopped the Paris Metro and shut down the city's electricity and telephone system. Afterwards, new dams were constructed along the Seine and its major tributaries. No comparable floods have taken place since.

== The end of the Belle Époque ==
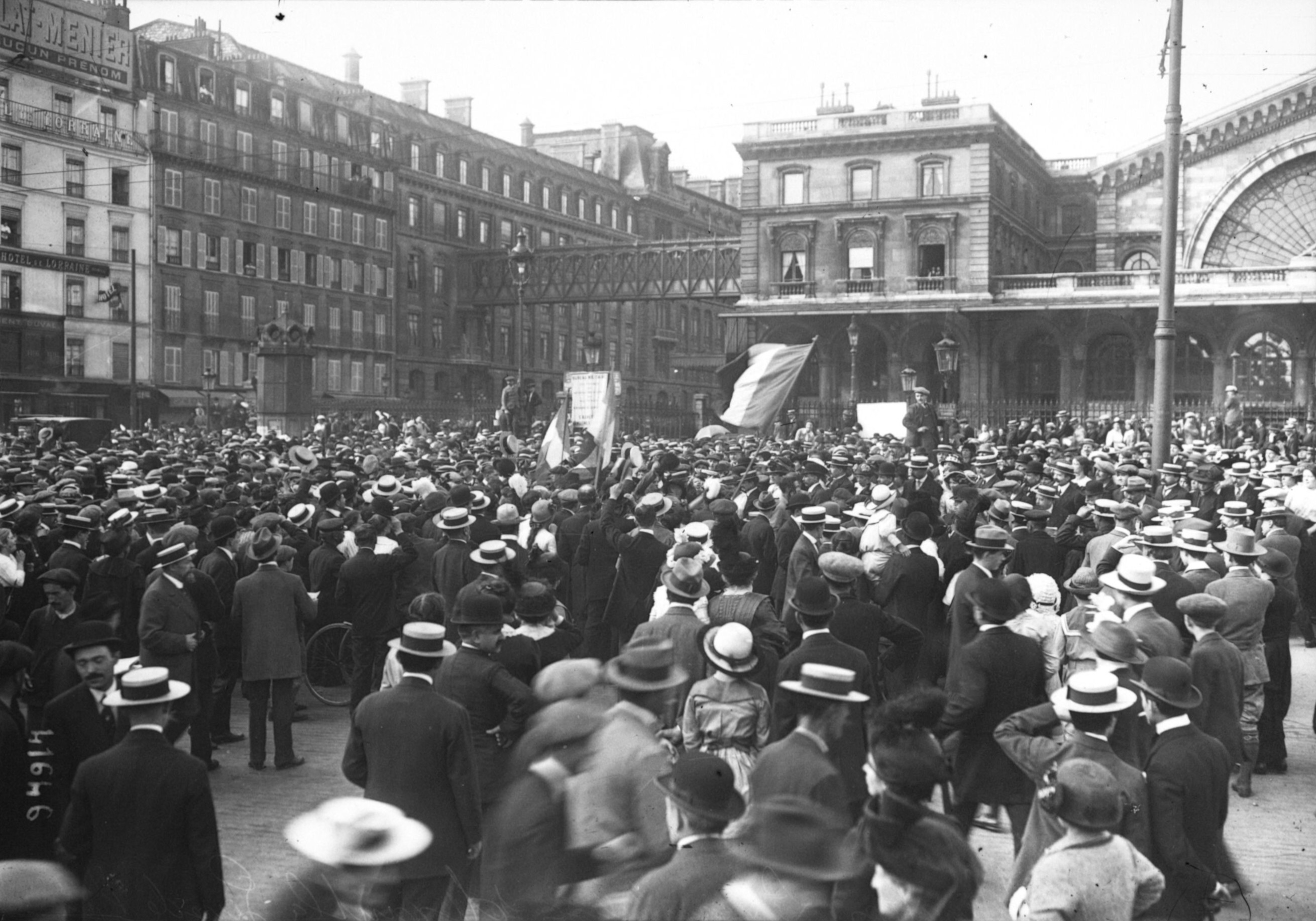
Parisians assemble outside the Gare de l'Est for mobilization into the army (August 2, 1914)

On 28 June 1914, the news reached Paris of the assassination of the Archduke Franz Ferdinand of Austria by Serbian nationalists in Sarajevo. Austria-Hungary declared war on Serbia on 28 July, and following the terms of their alliances, Germany joined Austria-Hungary, while Russia, Britain and France went to war against Austria-Hungary and Germany. France declared a general mobilization on 1 August 1914. On the day before the mobilization, the leader of the French socialists, Jean Jaurès, was assassinated by a mentally disturbed man in the Café du Croissant near the headquarters of the socialist newspaper L'Humanité in Montmartre. The new war was supported by both French nationalists, who saw an opportunity to gain back Alsace and Lorraine from Germany, and by most on the left, who saw an opportunity to overthrow the monarchies in Germany and Austria-Hungary. Parisian men of military age were ordered to report to mobilization points in the city; only one percent did not appear.

The German army rapidly approached Paris. On 30 August, a German plane dropped three bombs on the Rue des Récollets, the Quai de Valmy and the Rue des Vinaigriers, killing one woman. Planes dropped bombs on 31 August and 1 September. On 2 September, a bulletin of the military governor of Paris announced that the French government had left the city "in order to give a new impulsion to the defense of the nation." On 6 September, six hundred Parisian taxis were called upon to carry soldiers to the front lines of the First Battle of the Marne. The offensive of the Germans was stopped and their army pulled back. Parisians were urged to leave the city; by 8 September, the population of the city had fallen to 1,800,000, or 63 percent of the population in 1911. For the Parisians, four more years of war and hardship lay ahead. The Belle Époque became just a memory.

== Chronology ==
=== 1871-1899 ===
- 1872
  - Population: 1,850,000
  - 13 January – opening of the École Libre des Sciences Politiques, or Sciences Po.
- 1873
- 24 July – Law passed supporting the construction of the Basilica of Sacré-Cœur on Montmartre, financed by private contributions.
- 1874
  - French government returns to Paris from Versailles. MacMahon, first president of the French Third Republic, moves into the Élysée Palace.
  - 7 May – Société de l'histoire de Paris et de l'Île-de-France founded at the École nationale des chartes.
  - 15 April – First Paris exhibit by Impressionist painters in the studio of the photographer Nadar.
  - 12 August – Opening of canal bringing the water of the Vanne river to Paris.
- 1875
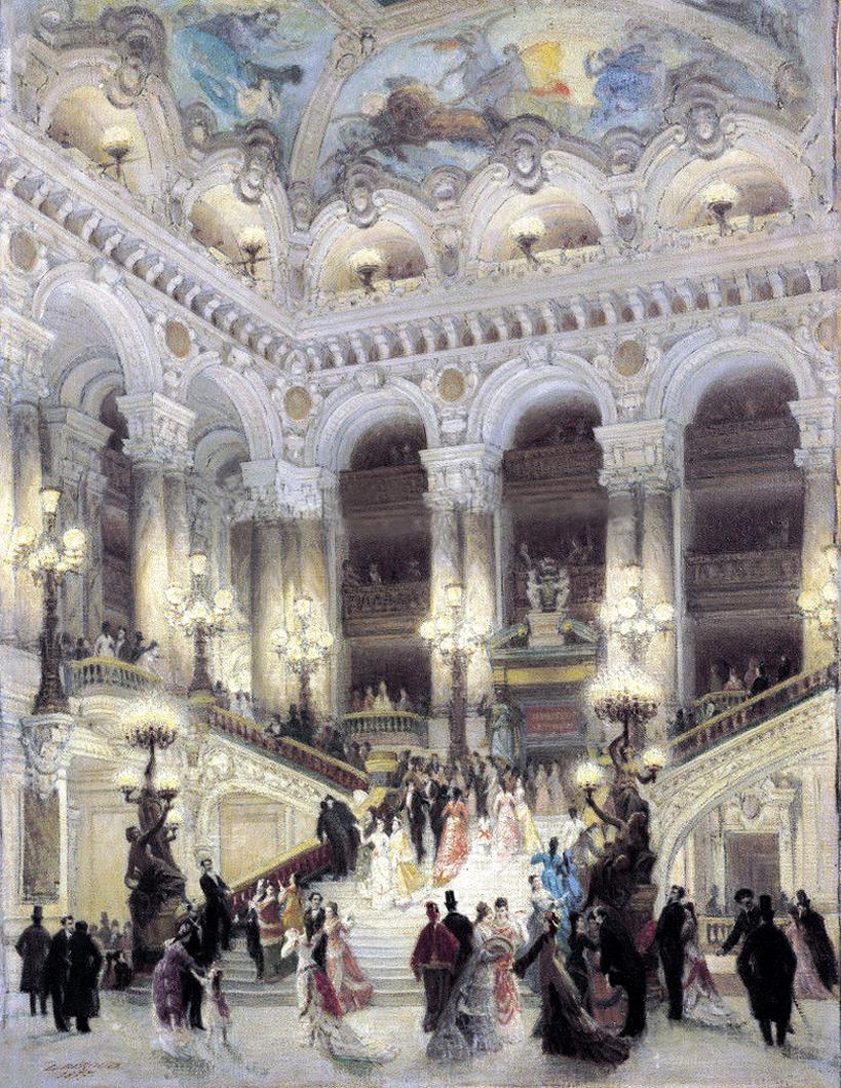
  The grand stairway of the Paris Opera (1875)
  - 5 January – Opening of the Palais Garnier opera house.
  - 3 March: Premiere of Bizet's opera Carmen.
  - 15 June – first stone placed of the Basilica of Sacré-Cœur.
- 1877
  - Population: 1,985,000
- 1878
  - 1 May – Opening of the Universal Exposition of 1878 held at the Trocadero Palace and on the Champ de Mars.
  - 30 May – The first test of electric lighting on the Avenue de l'Opéra and the Place de l'Étoile.
- 1879
  - July – Installation of first telephone system in Paris.
- 1880
  - 3 January – The ice on the Seine thaws suddenly, and the river rises more than two meters in three hours, sweeping away the Pont des Invalides under reconstruction.
  - 10 July – Amnesty for those imprisoned or exiled after the Paris Commune.
  - 14 July – Bastille Day is celebrated officially for the first time since 1802.
  - The Brasserie des Bords du Rhin opens.
  - The Direction Régionale de Police Judiciaire de Paris opens its headquarters at 36 Quai des Orfèvres.
  - The History of Paris Carnavalet Museum opens.
- 1881
  - 15 August (through 15 November) – The International Exposition of Electricity is held, highlighted by the illumination of the Grands Boulevards with electric lights.
  - 18 August – Opening of the Le Chat Noir, the first modern cabaret, in Montmartre.
- 1882
  - January – Collapse of the Union Générale bank, the cause of the Paris Bourse crash of 1882.
  - 10 January – Opening of the Musée Grévin, the first Paris wax museum, in the Passage Jouffroy.
  - 12 April – Inauguration of the Musée d'Ethnographie du Trocadéro.
  - 13 July – Opening of the reconstructed Hôtel de Ville, burned by the Commune in 1871.
- 1883
  - 16 June – The Catholic daily newspaper La Croix begins publication.
  - 14 July – Inauguration of the statue Monument à la République on the Place de la République.
  - August – First municipal summer camp for students of the schools of the 9th arrondissement.
  - 22 September – The opening of the first lycée for girls, the Lycée Fénelon.
- 1884
  - 7 March – Decree requiring the use of trash cans, nicknamed poubelles after the Prefect of Paris Eugène Poubelle, who introduced it.
  - 8 July – Opening of the first municipal swimming pool at 31 Rue du Château-Landon.
  - 23 July – Law allowing construction of residential buildings up to seven stories high.
  - 7 November – Last serious cholera epidemic in Paris.
  - Students' General Association of Paris founded.
  - Les Deux Magots café opens.
  - Samuel Bing art gallery opens.
  - Premiere of Massenet's opera Manon.
  - 2 February – Municipal Council allows women to work as interns in Paris hospitals.
  - 1 June – Huge crowds observe the funeral procession of Victor Hugo, whose remains are placed in the Panthéon.
  - 3 August – First stone laid for the new buildings of the Sorbonne.
- 1887
  - January – Construction begins of the Eiffel Tower. The structure is strongly condemned by leading Paris writers and artists.
  - 25 May – A fire destroys the Opéra-Comique during a performance of Mignon; more than a hundred persons are killed.
- 1888
  - 14 November – Dedication of the Institut Pasteur by Louis Pasteur.
  - Lycée Molière opens.

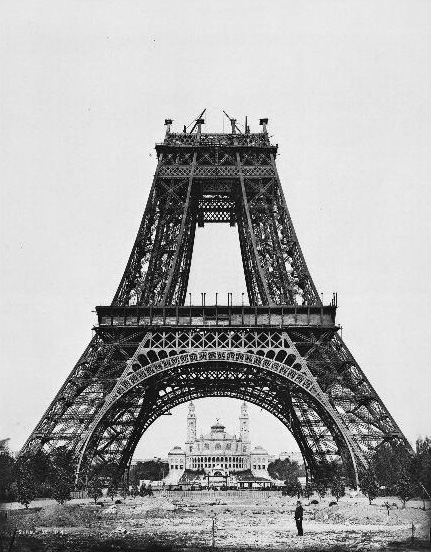
The Eiffel Tower under construction (August 1888)

- 1889
  - First Paris telephone book published.
  - 30 January – First cremation in France at Père Lachaise Cemetery.
  - 2 April – Opening of the Eiffel Tower. Guests must climb to the top by the stairs, because the elevators are not finished until May 19.
  - 6 May – Opening of the Universal Exposition of 1889. Before it closes on 6 November, the Exposition is seen by twenty-five million visitors.
  - 14 July – Socialist Second International founded in Paris.
  - 5 August – Opening of the grand amphitheater of the new Sorbonne.
- 1890
  - 1 May – First celebration of May 1 Labor Day by socialists in France, leading to confrontations with police.
- 1891 – Population: 2,448,000
  - 15 March – One time zone, Paris time, is established for all of France.
  - 20 May – First professional cooking school founded on the Rue Bonaparte.
- 1892
  - Le Journal newspaper begins publication.
  - First use of reinforced concrete to construct a building in Paris, at 1 Rue Danton.
  - 4 October – Launch of the first weather balloon from the Parc Monceau.
- 1893
  - 7 April – Café Maxim's opens.
  - 12 April – opening of the Olympia music hall on the Boulevard des Capucines.
  - 3 July – Disturbances in the Latin Quarter between students and supporters of Senator René Bérenger over supposedly indecent costumes worn at the Bal des Quatre z'arts. One person is killed.
  - December – Opening of the Vélodrome d'hiver cycling stadium on the Rue Suffren, in the former Galerie des Machines from the 1889 Exposition.
  - 9 December – the anarchist Auguste Vaillant explodes a bomb in the National Assembly, injuring forty-six persons.
    Poster for the first public screening of a motion picture at the Grand Café, Paris (1895)
- 1894
  - 10 to 30 January – The Photo-club de Paris, founded in 1888 by Constant Puyo, Robert Demachy and Maurice Boucquet, holds the first International Exposition of Photography at the Galeries Georges Petit, 8 rue de Sèze (8th arrondissement), devoted to photography as an art rather than a science. The exhibit launches the movement called Pictorialism.
  - First championship of France football tournament between six Parisian teams.
  - 12 February – The anarchist Émile Henry explodes a bomb in the café of the Gare Saint-Lazare, killing one person and wounding twenty-three.
  - 15 March – The anarchist Amédée Pauwels explodes a bomb in the church of La Madeleine. One person, the bomber, is killed.
  - 22 July – The first automobile race, organized by Le Petit Journal, from Paris to Rouen.
  - Asile George Sand (women's shelter) opens.
- 1895
  - Opening of the first Galeries Lafayette department store
  - 22 March – first projected showing of a motion picture by Louis Lumière at a conference on the future industry of cinematography at 44 Rue de Rennes.
  - 10 August – The founding of Gaumont, the first major French film studio.
  - Le Cordon Bleu cooking school opens.
  - Maison de l'Art Nouveau art gallery opens.
  - 12 November – French Automobile Club is founded.
  - 28 December – First public projection of a motion picture by the Lumière Brothers in the basement of the Grand Café on the corner of Rue Scribe and the Boulevard des Capucines. Thirty-eight persons attend, including future director Georges Méliès.
- 1896
  - 6 October – Czar Nicholas II of Russia lays the first stone for the Pont Alexandre III.
  - 7 December – the Municipal Council approves the project to build the first Paris Metropolitan subway line.
- 1897
  - The Théâtre du Grand-Guignol opens.
  - The Parc des Princes velodrome opens.
  - 4 April – The first women are allowed to attend the École des Beaux-Arts.
  - 13 July – The opening of the Musée de l'Armée (Army Museum) at Les Invalides.
  - 3 September – opening of the first movie theater, in the Théâtre Robert-Houdon on the Boulevard des Italiens. The theater is rented for three months by Georges Méliès to show films.
  - 4 December – The first Paris automobile show held as part of the "Salon du Cycle" at the Palais des Sports on the Rue de Berri.
- 1898
  - 13 January – Émile Zola publishes his open letter to the President of France on the Dreyfus affair, J'accuse in L'Aurore newspaper.
  - 20 April – The first motorcycle race at Longchamp Racecourse.
  - 19 September – The work begins on the Paris Métro.
  - 20 October – The first wireless communication made between the Eiffel Tower and the Panthéon by Eugène Ducretet and Ernest Roger.
  - The Hôtel Ritz Paris opens.
  - Le Dôme Café opens.
- 1899
  - Inauguration of the monumental statue Triomphe de la République by Jules Dalou on the Place de la Nation.

=== 1900–1913 ===
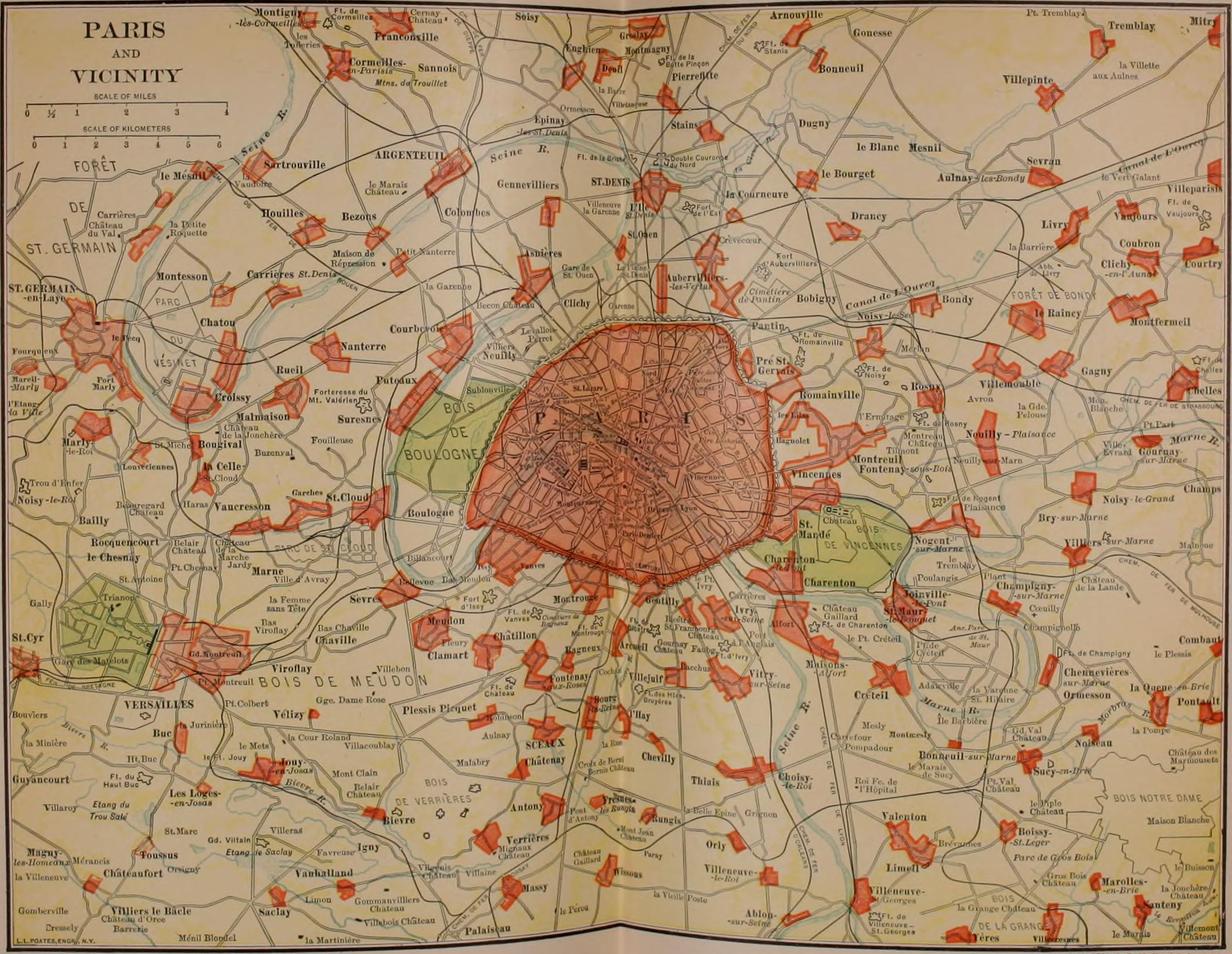
1905 map of Greater Paris, with the city centre still largely confined within the city walls.

- 1900
  - 13 February – Whistles are issued to Paris traffic policemen.
  - 24 February – The first newsreel films, of the Boer War, are shown at the Olympia Theater.
  - 14 April – The opening of the Universal Exposition of 1900 that involved the building of the Grand Palais, the Petit Palais, and the Pont Alexandre III. Before it closes on 12 November, the Exposition attracts more than fifty million visitors.
  - 13 May – Right-wing candidates win the municipal elections after twenty years of domination by the left.
  - 14 May – The opening of the 1900 Summer Olympics, Olympiad II, the first Olympic games held outside Greece.
  - 19 July – The opening of the first line of the Paris Métro, between the Porte de Versailles and Porte Maillot.
  - 15 September – Automatic ticket gates for the metro are replaced by ticket agents due to the high number of people jumping the gates.
  - 4 December – Law passed permitting women to practice law.
- 1901
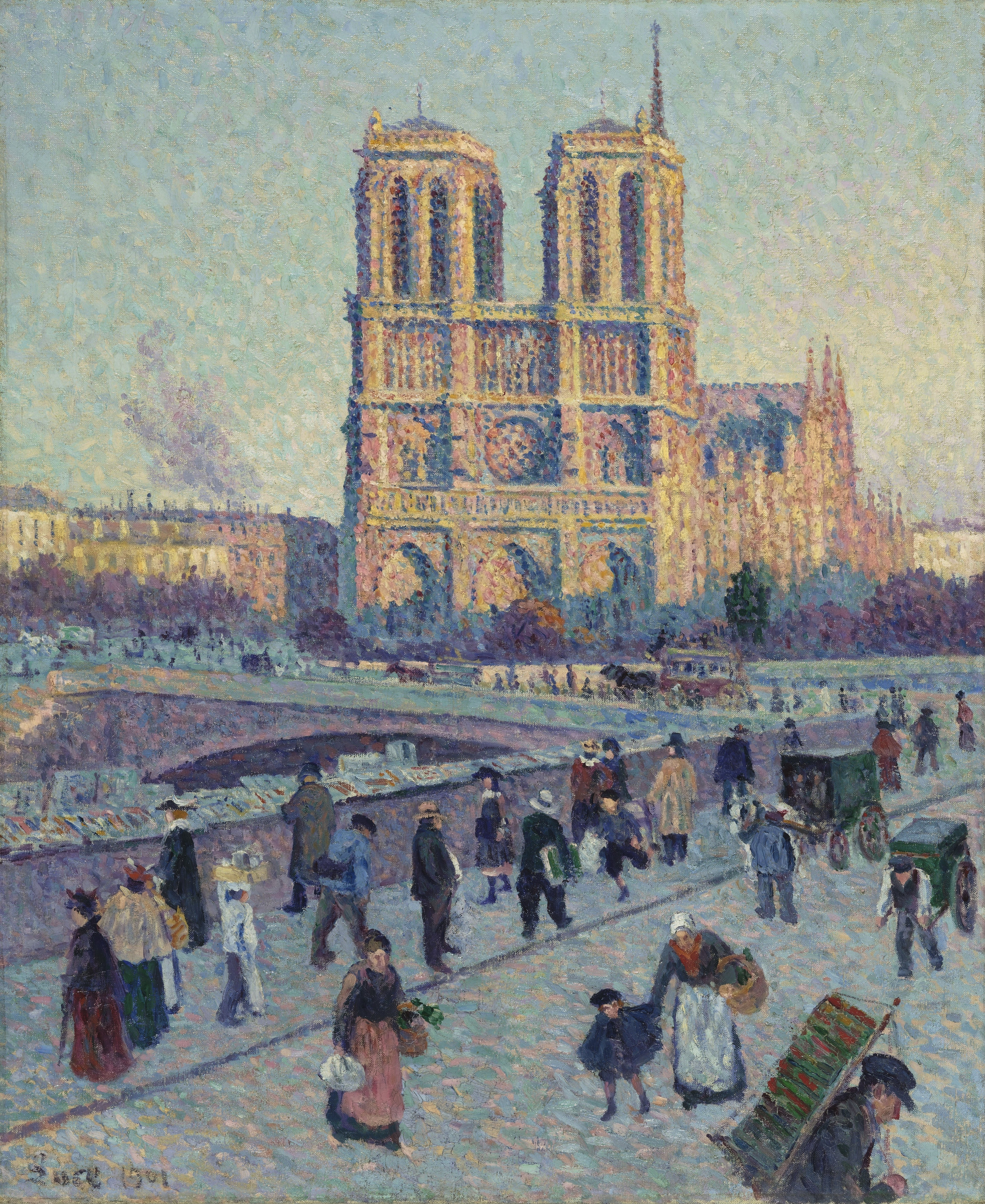
  The Quai Saint-Michel and Notre-Dame, by Maximilien Luce (1901)
  - Population: 2,715,000
  - The Pathé opens a film production studio in Vincennes.
  - April 1 – The opening of the new Gare de Lyon train station, including the restaurant Le Train Bleu.
  - 1 July – The opening of the first electric train line in Europe between Les Invalides and Versailles.
  - 28 September – First European lawn tennis championship held in Paris.
- 1902
  - 26 January – First Gitanes cigarettes go on sale.
  - 16 October – First use of fingerprints by Paris police to identify a murderer.
  - Première of the Georges Méliès film A Trip to the Moon.
  - Première of the opera Pelléas et Mélisande by Claude Debussy.
- 1903
  - 1 July – Start of the first Tour de France, which ended on 19 July with a parade of the winners at the Parc des Princes.
  - 10 August – The first serious Métro accident at Couronnes station, with eighty-four persons killed.
  - 4 September – Opening of the haute couture fashion house of Paul Poiret.
  - The first Vélodrome d'hiver cycling stadium opens in the former Galerie des Machines of the 1900 Paris Exposition.
  - Première of Octave Mirbeau's play Business is Business.
- 1904
  - 6 February – Opening of the Alhambra music hall on Rue de Malte.
  - 18 April – The socialist (later Communist) newspaper L'Humanité begins publication.
  - 8 May – Socialists and radicals win the Paris municipal elections.
  - 23 November – Consecration of the first Paris church built of concrete, Saint-Jean-l'Évangéliste de Montmartre.
  - 20 December – The first automobile taxis go into service.
- 1905
  - After viewing the boldly colored canvases of Henri Matisse, André Derain, Maurice de Vlaminck and others at the Salon d'Automne of 1905, the critic Louis Vauxcelles disparages the painters as "fauves" (wild beasts), thus giving their movement the name by which it became known, Fauvism.
  - Gaumont's Cité Elgé studios opens at Buttes-Chaumont.
  - First underground public toilets open at the Place de la Madeleine.
- 1906
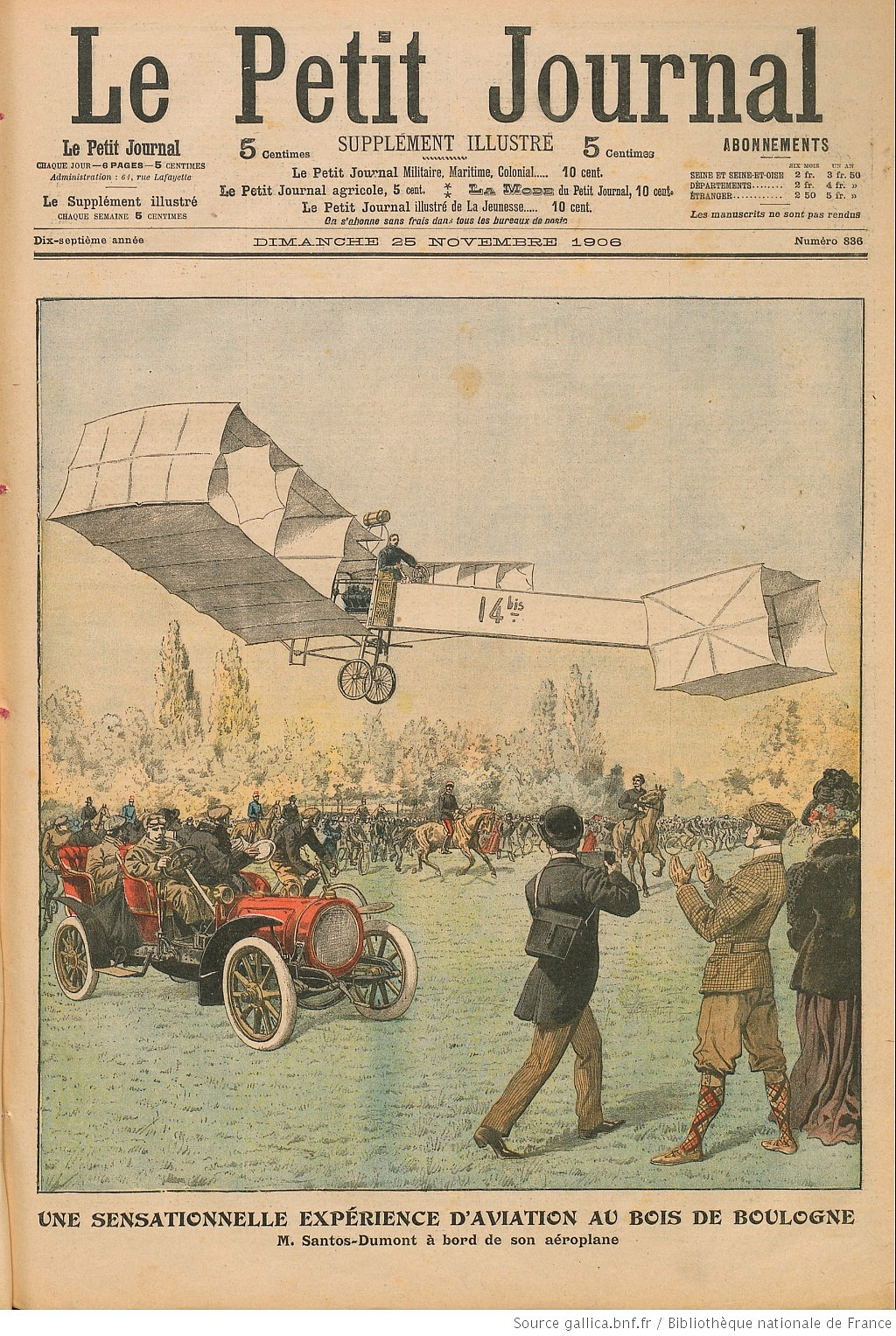
  First Paris flight by Alberto Santos-Dumont in 1906.
  - Population: 2,722,731.
  - 22 March – First England-France Rugby match played at the Parc des Princes.
  - 11 June – The first motorized bus line begins service between Montmartre and Saint-Germain-des-Prés. Horse-drawn omnibuses continued to run until January 1913.
  - 23 October – First airplane flight in Paris by Santos-Dumont, who flew sixty meters at an altitude of three meters at the Parc de Bagatelle.
- 1907
  - 22 February – First woman receives a license to drive a taxi in Paris.
  - 25 March – The first traffic roundabout created in Paris at the Place de l'Étoile.
  - Summer. Pablo Picasso, living in the Bateau-Lavoir in Montmartre, paints Les Demoiselles d'Avignon, a major turning point in modern art.
  - The Kahnweiler art gallery opens.
- 1909
  - 1 March – First escalator installed in a Paris Métro station.
  - 29 May – Opening of the Luna Park amusement park at the Porte Maillot.
  - 2 June – Paris première of the ballet Les Sylphides by Sergei Diaghilev's Ballets Russes at the Théâtre du Châtelet, Paris, with Vaslav Nijinsky and Anna Pavlova in the leading roles.
  - 13 December – Creation of first one-way streets in Paris on the Rue de Mogador and Rue de la Chaussée-d'Antin.
- 1910
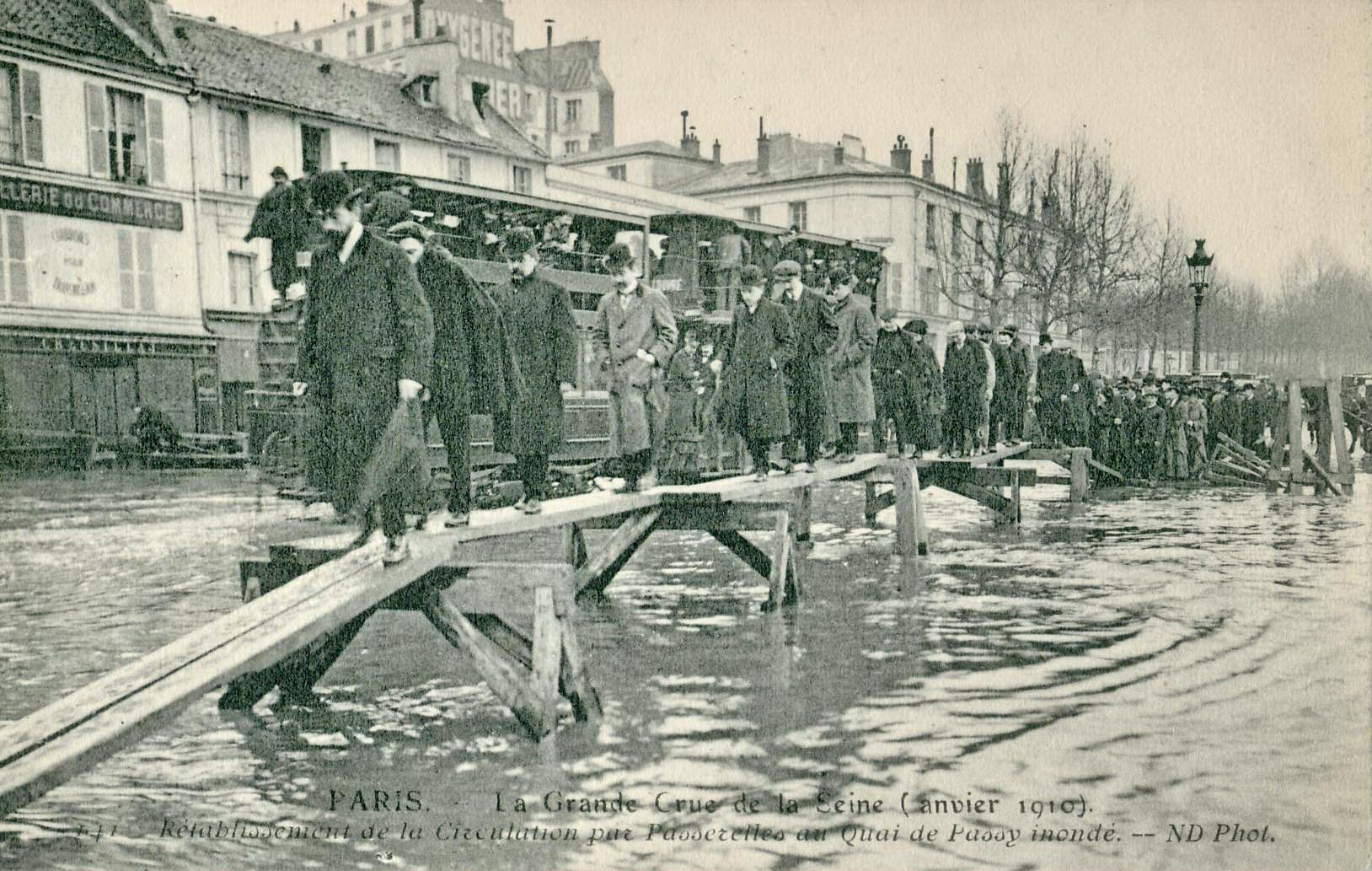
  The Quai de Passy during the 1910 Great Flood of Paris
  - January 21–28 – Great flood of Paris. The Seine rises 8.5 meters, the highest level since 1658, and overflows its banks. The flood affects one sixth of the buildings in Paris.
  - 13 February – Opening of the Vélodrome d'hiver cycling stadium on the Rue de Grenelle.
  - 3 December – First use of neon lights on the Grand Palais. The first neon advertising sign appears on the Boulevard Montmartre in 1912.
  - Coco Chanel opens her first boutique, called Chanel Modes, at 21 Rue Cambon.
  - First Gauloises cigarettes go on sale.
  - According to Robert Delaunay, Salle II of the 1910 Salon des Indépendants is "the first collective manifestation of a new art (un art naissant), known two years later as Cubism.
  - At the Salon d'Automne of 1910, held from 1 October to 8 November, Jean Metzinger introduces an extreme form of what would soon be labeled Cubism.
- 1911
  - 24 January – Departure of the first Paris-Monte Carlo automobile race.
  - 22 August – The Mona Lisa is stolen from the Louvre. It is recovered in Florence in December 1913.
  - Gaumont-Palace cinema opens.
  - Fictional Fantômas crime series begins publication.
  - The 1911 Salon des Indépendants officially introduces "Cubism" to the public as an organized group movement.
- 1912
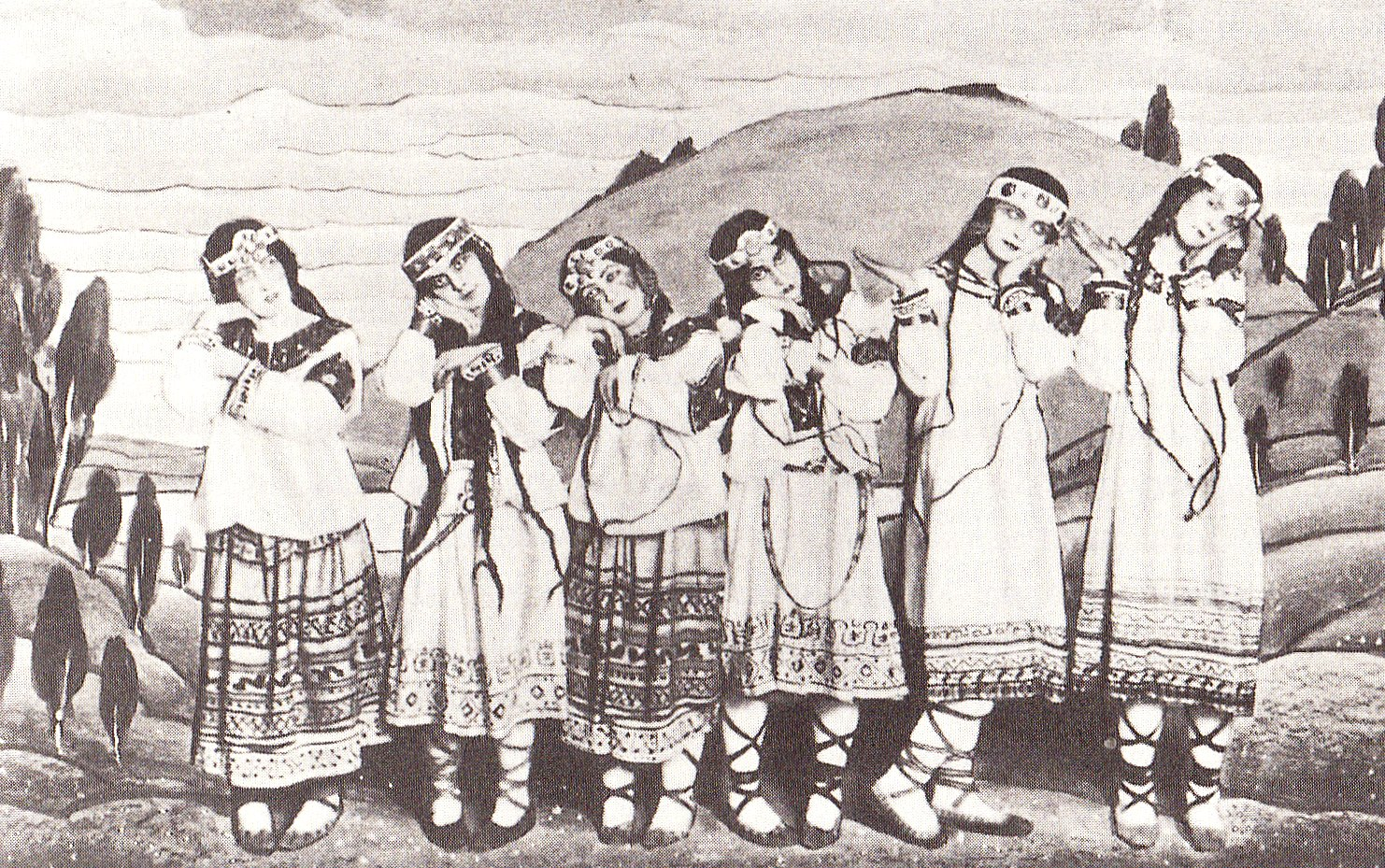
  Dancers from Stravinsky's The Rite of Spring (1913).
  - 15 February – Opening of the "Maison de Beauté" salon of Helena Rubenstein at 255 Rue Saint-Honoré.
  - 4 May – Criminal Brigade of the Sûreté formed to deal with major crimes and criminals.
  - 1 June – First world tennis championship held at the Stade de la Faisanderie in Saint-Cloud.
  - 29 May – Premiere of Nijinsky's ballet Afternoon of a Faun.
  - The Cubist contribution to the 1912 Salon d'Automne creates a controversy in the Municipal Council of Paris leading to a debate in the French Chamber des Deputies about the use of public funds to provide the venue for such art. The Cubists are defended by the Socialist deputy Marcel Sembat.
- 1913
  - 31 March – Opening of the Théâtre des Champs-Élysées.
  - 29 May – Première of Stravinsky's ballet The Rite of Spring.
  - 1 October – First collection of trash by motorized trucks instead of handcarts.
  - 24 December – First presidential Christmas tree, placed at Trocadéro, is lit by President Raymond Poincaré.

== See also ==
- Paris architecture of the Belle Époque
