= The Turtle Seller =

Painting by Pierre Puvis de Chavannes

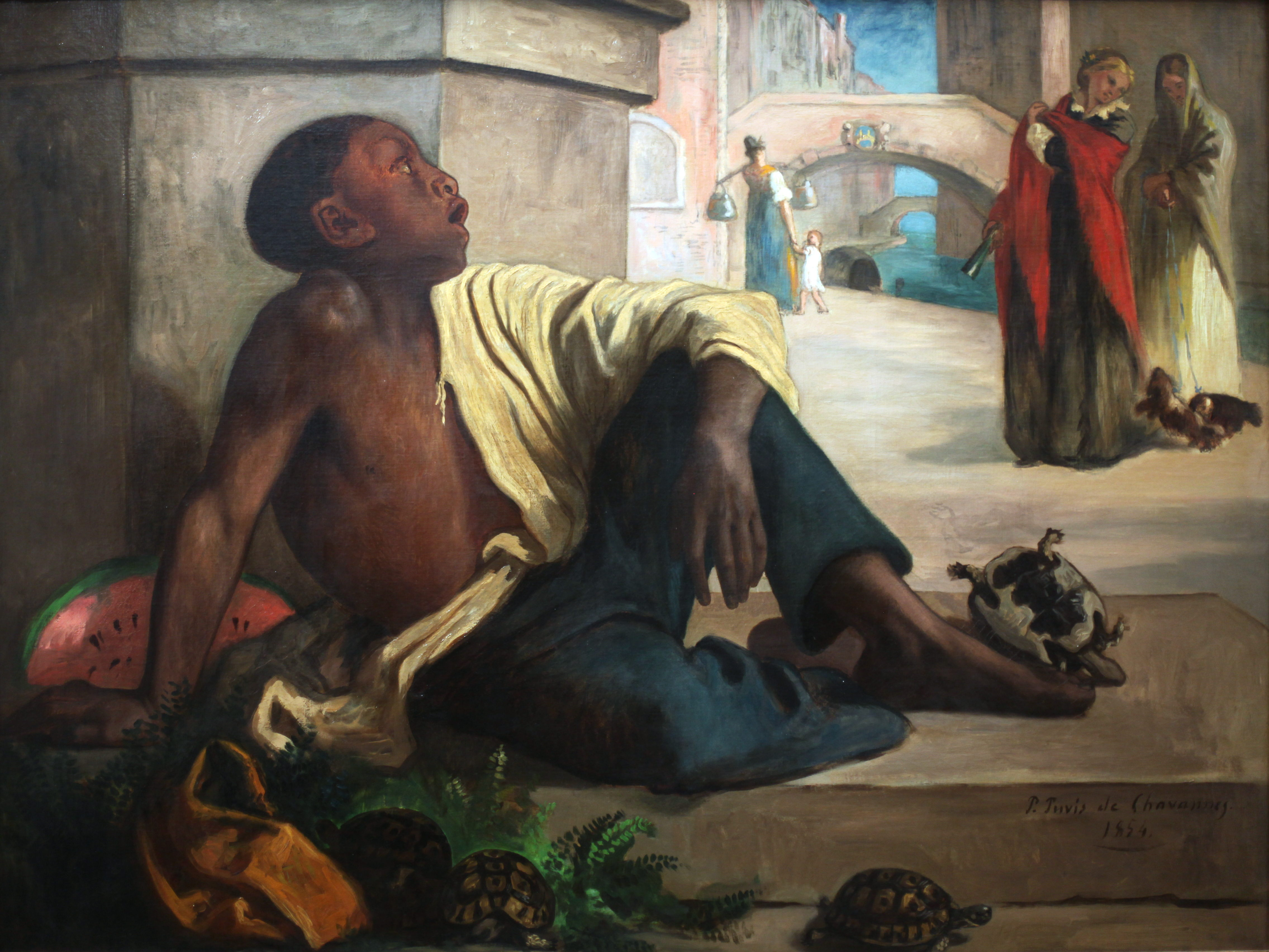
- Artist: Pierre Puvis de Chavannes
- Year: 1854
- Medium: Oil on canvas
- Dimensions: 89 cm × 118 cm (35 in × 46 in)
- Location: Musée d'Orsay, Paris

The Turtle Seller (French: Le marchand des tortues) is an oil on canvas painting executed in 1854 by the French painter Pierre Puvis de Chavannes. It has been held in the Musée d'Orsay, in Paris, since its acquisition in 2014.

== Description ==
The painting, measuring 89 by 118 cm, depicts a daytime scene on a canal in Venice. In the foreground there is a young black turtle seller, scantily dressed, half leaning against a column, with his gaze turned towards an apparently well-off lady and another one, while their two dogs are playing. In the center of the predominantly gray-pink painting, a woman, accompanied by her child, transports two buckets using a yoke. The child seller does have several turtles nearby, one of them is upside down, at his right, and seems to be touting them. Several bridges over the channels are seen in the background.

== Provenance ==
The Turtle Seller remained in the possession of the artist until 1898. It then became a property of his nephew Camille Jordan, who later moved to London. After several ownerships the painting was purchased by the Musée d'Orsay, in 2014.
