= Sacred grove (disambiguation) =

Sacred grove or similar may mean:

- sacred grove or sacred woods, a grove of trees of special religious importance to a particular culture.
- "Grove" or "Sacred grove" means an Asherah pole, a cult image, in some translations of the Bible
- Sacred Grove (Latter Day Saints), a historical site of The Church of Jesus Christ of Latter-day Saints in Ontario County, New York
- The Sacred Grove, (Arabic: al-Mash'ar al-Haram), Hajj prayer site and roofless mosque in Muzdalifah
- The Sacred Grove, (Italian: Sacro Bosco), in the Gardens of Bomarzo, renaissance garden, Lazio, Italy
- The Sacred Grove, burial ground of the Temple of Vesta
- Sacred grove at the Temple of Zeus, Olympia
- Sacred grove at Dodona, Athens
- Sacred grove of the Oracle at Delphi
- The Sacred Grove, grave site in Steuben Memorial State Historic Site, Oneida County, New York
- The Sacred Grove, Beloved of the Arts and Muses (French: le Bois Sacré), original name for the frieze The Allegory of the Sorbonne by Puvis de Chavannes
- The Sacred Grove, name given by artist John La Farge to an oak-hickory forest at Paradise, Rhode Island; after the sacred grove of Virgil
- The Sacred Grove, wooded area now occupied by the Stevenson Center of Vanderbilt University
- The Sacred Grove: Essays on Museums by Dillon Ripley, 1969
- A location in The Legend of Zelda: Twilight Princess with a folk house theme

== See also ==
- Sacred tree
- Sacred wood (disambiguation)
- Sacred natural site
