= The Poor Fisherman =

Painting by Pierre Puvis de Chavannes

- Le Pauvre Pêcheur (French)
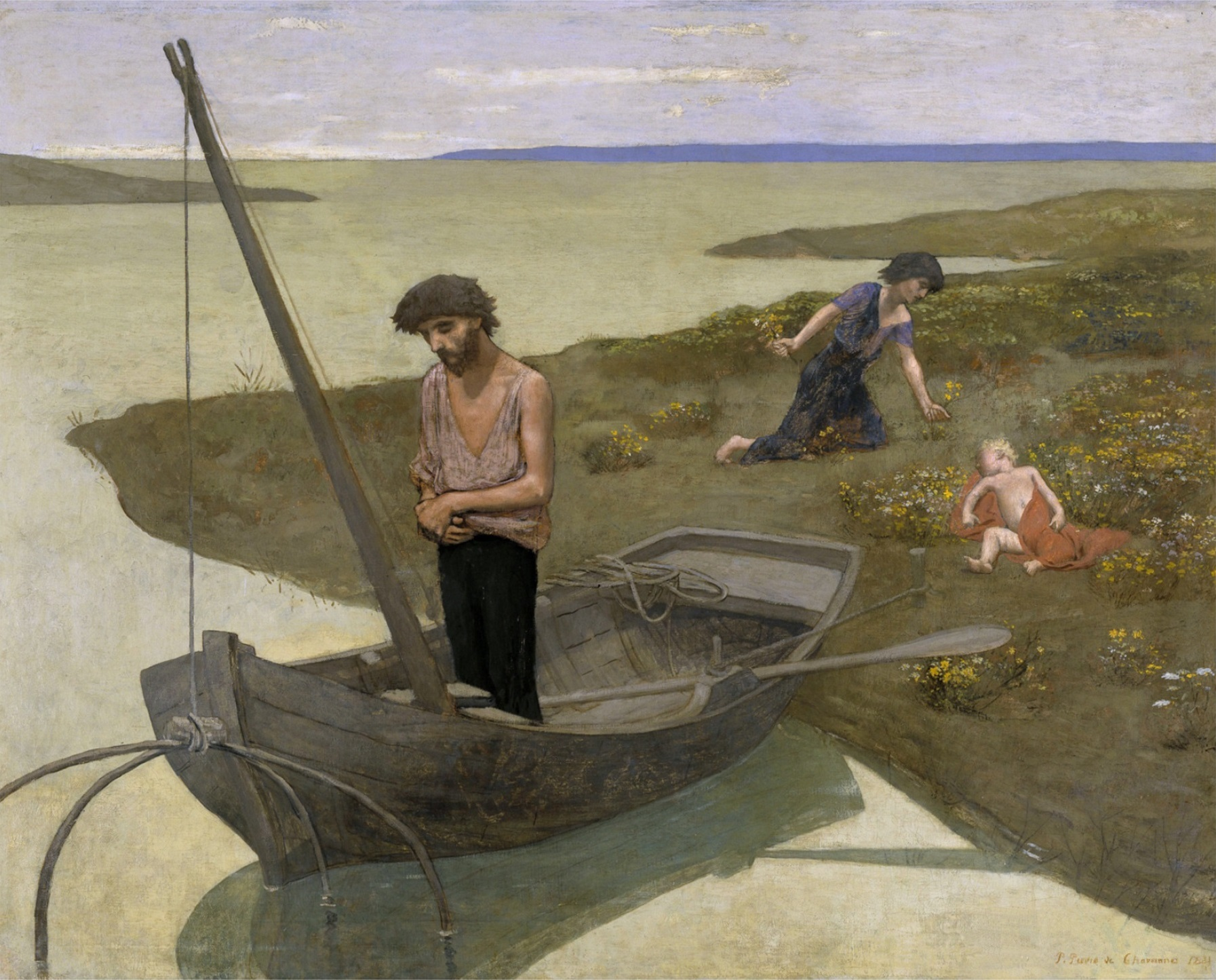
- Artist: Pierre Puvis de Chavannes
- Year: 1881
- Medium: Oil on canvas
- Dimensions: 155.5 cm × 192.5 cm (61.2 in × 75.8 in)
- Location: Musée d'Orsay, Paris

The Poor Fisherman (French: Le Pauvre Pêcheur) is an oil on canvas painting by the French painter Pierre Puvis de Chavannes, created in 1879–1881. The first version is held in the Musée d'Orsay, in Paris.

== Description ==
The painting is set in a desolated landscape, where a river occupies most of its space. In the foreground there is a bearded fisherman standing, with eyes closed and hands crossed, in a boat in a waiting gesture and meditative posture. His net is immersed in the water and he probably is hoping to have a better catch than before. His poor and hard life is visible in his tattered gray robes. Similarly, a woman is depicted, who is an older child or the fisherman's wife, collecting flowers or edible roots. Only the child is dressed in a brightly colored robe, which may be a symbol of hope for the future but also of suffering resulting from poverty.

The current painting was one of the most frequently interpreted images of French symbolism. According to the painter himself, the work depicts a fisherman and his two children, and they are supposed to personify poverty. According to other symbolists, the painting was supposed to be an allegory of man's fate or to represent faith in God and the rebirth of life. For others, the figure of the fisherman is an allegory of Jesus Christ.

The painting was painted in an undefined style, with no historical motifs or genre scenes. It was totally different from the then fashionable style presented at the Salons. Despite this, the canvas was enthusiastically received by the young symbolists and was the first work of the artist to be included in the collection of a national museum. The painting received some criticism, mainly related to its supposed lack of realism.

== Provenance ==
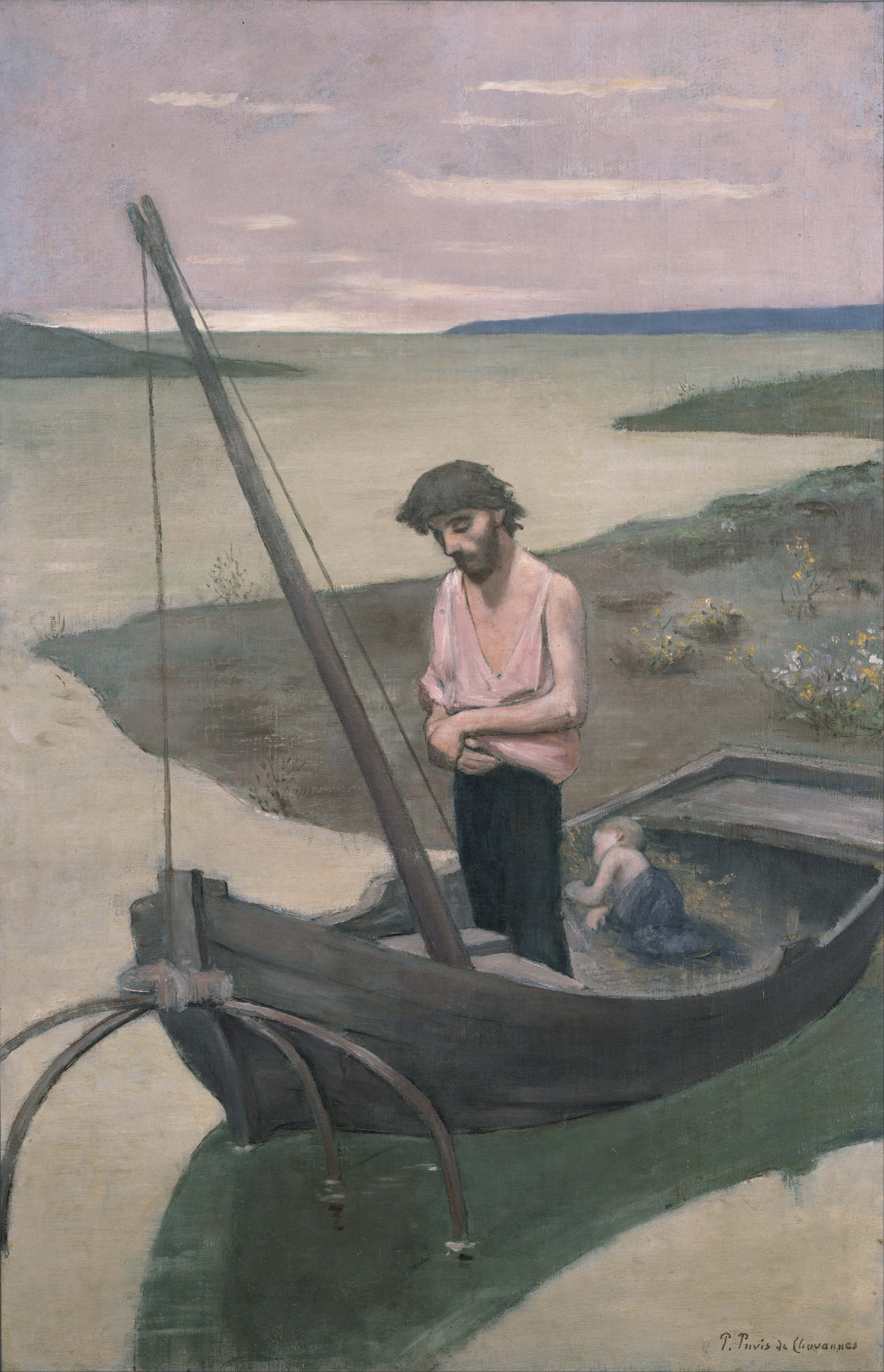
Second version (1887)

In 1887, this painting, then in the possession of the collector Émile Boivin, was bought by the French state, thanks to the art dealer Paul Durand-Ruel, and included in the collection of the Musée du Luxembourg, in Paris, where it remained until 1929. It was in the collection of the Louvre, from 1929 to 1986, when it was moved to the Musée d'Orsay, where it still hangs.

== Other versions ==
To compensate Boivin, Puvis de Chavannes painted him another painting with the same title. This new version is vertical, as new elements, the child is inside the boat and the woman is missing. This painting is in the National Museum of Western Art, in Tokyo.

A third, unfinished version is located in the Smith College Museum of Art, in Northampton, Massachusetts, and is a smaller version of the original from the Musée d'Orsay. Some experts question its authenticity.
