= Sacred wood =

Sacred wood or Sacred Woods may refer to:

- Sacred grove, a mythological landscape, referenced in many traditions or religions
- The Sacred Wood, a collection of essays by T.S. Eliot
- Sacred Woods, a 1939 French comedy film
- "Sacred Woods", a song by Varien featuring Skyelle

== See also ==
- Sacred grove (disambiguation)
