= The Shepherd's Song (painting) =

Painting by Pierre Puvis de Chavannes

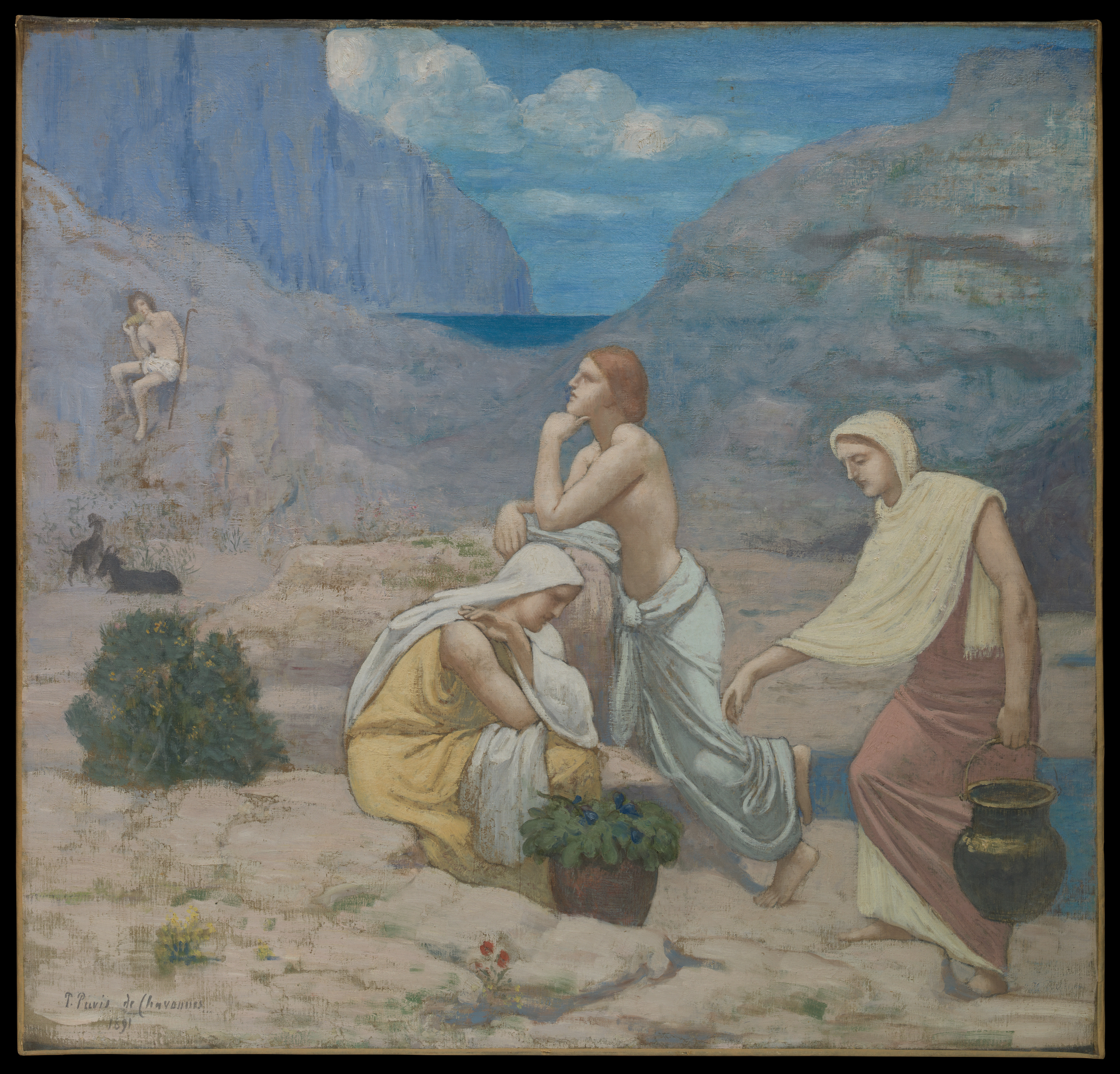
- Artist: Pierre Puvis de Chavannes
- Year: 1891
- Medium: Oil on canvas
- Dimensions: 104.5 cm × 109.9 cm (41.1 in × 43.3 in)
- Location: Metropolitan Museum of Art; New York
- Accession: 06.177

The Shepherd's Song is an oil on canvas painting by French artist Pierre Puvis de Chavannes, from 1891. It depicts shepherds lounging and foraging in an arid landscape. The painting - which was inspired by one of de Chavannes' earlier works - is now in the collection of the Metropolitan Museum of Art, in New York.

== Description ==
De Chavannes used for inspiration of this painting an earlier mural he had painted. Like his earlier work, the new painting possesses what has been described as a dreamlike feel. The titular shepherds were likely inspired by classical sculpture, while the muted colors of the painting were likely inspired by 15th and 16th century Italian frescoes.
