= The Sacred Grove, Beloved of the Arts and Muses =

Painting by Pierre Puvis de Chavannes

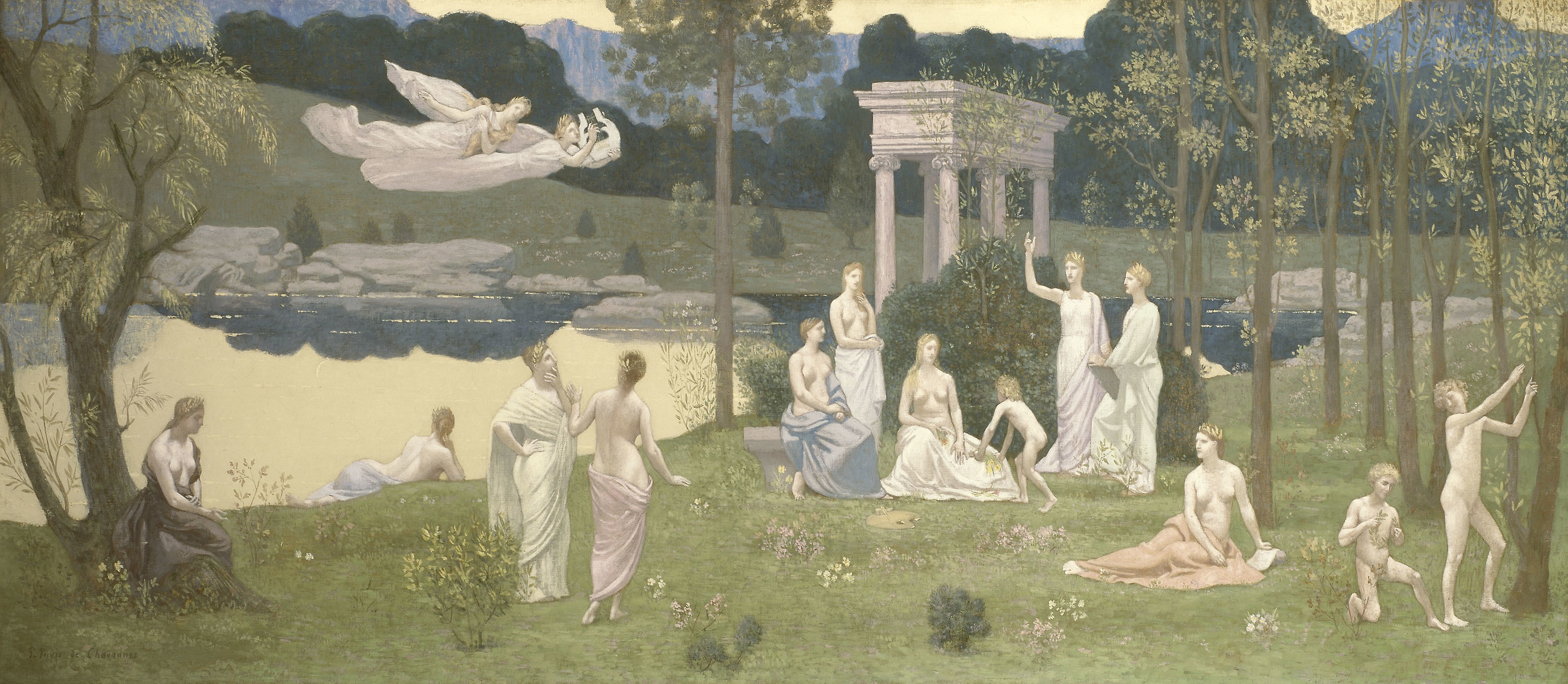
- Artist: Pierre Puvis de Chavannes
- Year: 1884
- Medium: Oil on canvas
- Movement: Symbolism
- Dimensions: 93 cm × 231 cm (37 in × 91 in)
- Location: Art Institute of Chicago, Chicago

The Sacred Grove, Beloved of the Arts and Muses or simply The Sacred Grove, French: Le Bois sacré cher aux arts et aux muses, refers to three separate oil on canvas paintings of the same name by Pierre Puvis de Chavannes, a French painter described by Vincent van Gogh as "the master of all of us".

The original version commissioned in 1883 was painted from 1884 to 1886, before being mounted to decorate the entry staircase of the Museum of Fine Arts of Lyon. The original The Sacred Grove is measured to be 460 x 1040 cm large. It is accompanied by two other paintings by Puvis: Vision antique and Inspiration chrétienne which were also oil on canvas and were both completed in 1885.

The original piece in Lyon stemmed from a showcase piece which was a smaller painting (93 x 231 cm) exhibited without an explanatory text at the Paris Salon of 1884, where it won that year's grand prize. It acted as a test of The Sacred Grove’s success before the final version was to be displayed in the museum.

The original piece acted as inspiration for the third painting, also known as L’Ancienne Sorbonne, which developed the theme of The Sacred Grove. It was commissioned in 1886 (and finished in 1889) for the Grand Amphitheater of the Sorbonne, in Paris. This third piece was part of a Trinity of Republican commissions in Paris including Summer and Winter and L’Education de Sainte Geneviève et La Vie Pastoral de Saint Geneviève.

The three works depict a number of deistic figures draped loosely in sheets, surrounding a mythical forest. The paintings’ subject matter much like Puvis’ other works such as Antique Vision are related to Ancient Greek mythology and are stylised as classical pieces. The Sacred Grove of the Paris Salon is currently on display in the European Painting and Sculpture Gallery of the Art Institute of Chicago. The Sacred Grove commissioned for the Sorbonne is being exhibited at The Metropolitan Museum of Art, while the other remains in its respective museum in Lyons.

== Background ==
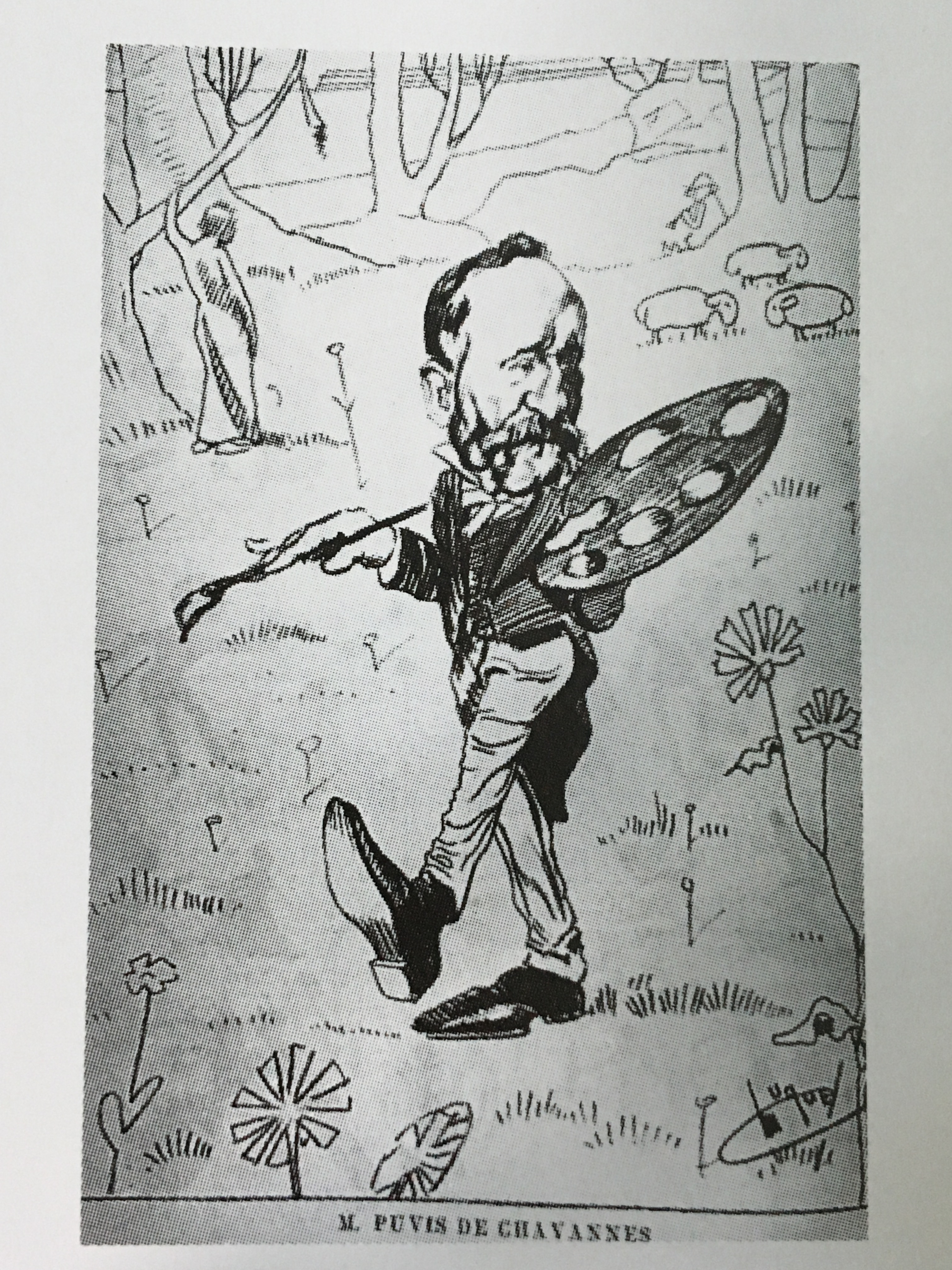
Caricature of Puvis de Chavannes by Lucque for La Caricature

The original The Sacred Grove, Beloved of the Arts and Muses was commissioned in 1883 as Royalists and Republicans battled for the meaning of France's identity, art pieces at the time, including The Sacred Grove intending to be exhibited in public spaces had to satisfy the ideological mindset of the commissioner (in this case that of the Republicans). Decorations for public viewing also had to have an educational purpose. These criteria served as a framework for Puvis in his structure and reasoning behind the piece, which served an educational purpose and put French patriotism on display.

Pierre Puvis de Chavannes was a well regarded painter during his life however his popularity diminished after his death, unlike most renowned artists. Before The Sacred Grove commission, he had paintings adorning the walls of the Panthéon in Paris as well as many other museums throughout France, including those in Poitiers and Marseilles. The Sacred Grove was the first of Puvis’ paintings to be developed from an easel version and unlike his other pieces did not depict historical events or well known geographical landscapes. Critics were unsure of the painting due to its different nature and unconventional creation, as well as its lack of explanation by Puvis when the showcase version was displayed in the Salon. The artist's good reputation then started to decrease substantially when Henri de Toulouse-Lautrec parodied The Sacred Grove and mocked Puvis’ more traditional artistry. A caricature was done in 1886 of Puvis, after The Sacred Grove had already been severely critiqued, presenting the artist as wandering aimlessly in one of his own fantastical landscapes. In 1884, there was also a caricature completed but of the painting itself rather than the painter, which greatly exaggerated the figures in The Sacred Grove and their movements.

== The Painting ==
=== Description ===
While most painters of the late 19th century were pursuing more modern subjects, The Sacred Grove is a nod to classical art and makes a direct reference to visions of Hellenistic Greece. Featuring frescoes and soft colours to create a piece that was described by the Japanese Bunkamura Museum as: “evoking a refined, tranquil atmosphere”. Jennifer Shaw, explained the painting as having an open foreground and “protective” background that created a “deep peace of serene solitude”, and “invited viewers to imagine entering the landscape and partaking in the reverie.”

The Sacred Grove depicts an “expansive idyllic landscape people by nearly life-sized muses.” It was described by critics as being “like a dream” as it differs from reality so deeply. The painting portrays a mythical forest populated by angels and the muses. Muses Polyhymnia (of rhetoric), Clio (of history) and Calliope (of epic poetry, science and philosophy) are centred in the painting directly in front of the fresco. Thalia (of Comedy and light poetry) and Terpsichore (of dance) are placed in poses of discussion and contemplation farther on the shore. Euterpe (of lyric poetry and music) and Erato (of love songs) are flying above the scene. Finally Melpomene (of song and tragedy) and Urania (of astronomy) are respectively sitting and lying by the river side. A painter's palette, sculptor's hammer and compass can also be seen in the foreground.

=== Structure and Symbolism ===
The Sacred Grove unlike other paintings of the time, is in a classical style which is much more calculated and restrained. Puvis employs a pyramidal device in many of his works, including Young Girls by the Seaside. The muses are placed in such a way that creates a triangle between them and the fresco in the background. The canvas is careful in its detail, which leaves the viewer with a sense of calm. The landscape is divided into four main horizontal panels, the foreground occupied by the muses and interspersed with flowers and greenery, the middle ground in which a river flows and the background made up of pale coloured mountains that surround the rest of the scene. The painting peopled with the muses dispersed in groups around the landscape, help to frame the composition through their body positions: reclining figures who "parallel the bank" and the seated muse on the left who echoes the tree's shape.

The Bunkamura Museum claimed that The Sacred Grove gives the viewer an image of a "Utopia" and depicts "a profound allegoric world...known as a pioneering body of Symbolist works." The Allegorical mode, based on knowledge and reason, is employed in the painting through the use of tributes to ancient Greek mythology: scriptures for law, the harp for music. Allegorical figures of painting, architecture and sculpture are also centred in the piece. The purpose of allegory is also to show the bond between science and the arts. Females were often pictured in the nude so as to idealise them and hold the audience's focus on the allegory itself, as can be seen in The Sacred Grove.

== Influence ==
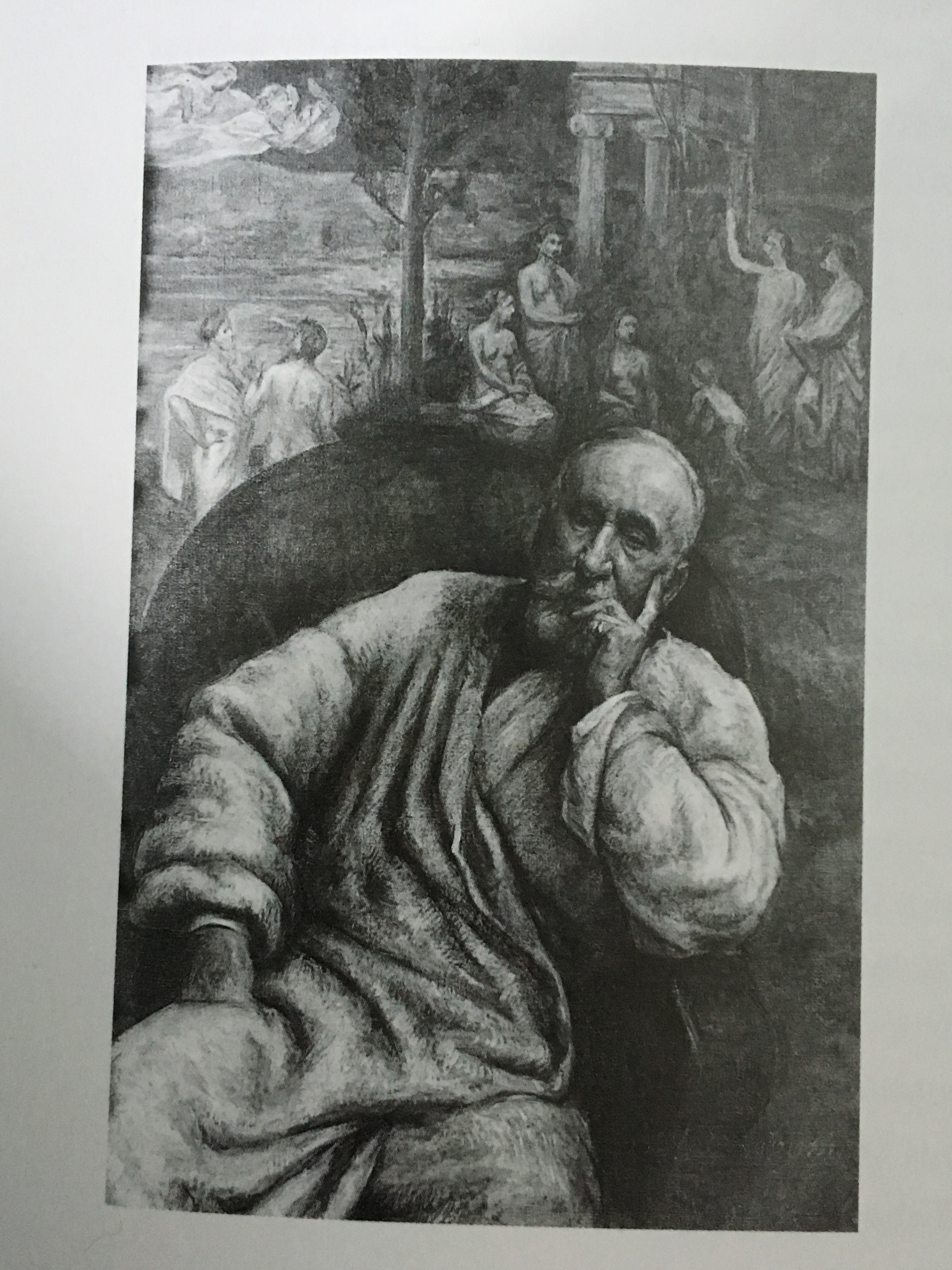
Portrait of Pierre Puvis de Chavannes by Marcellin Desboutin

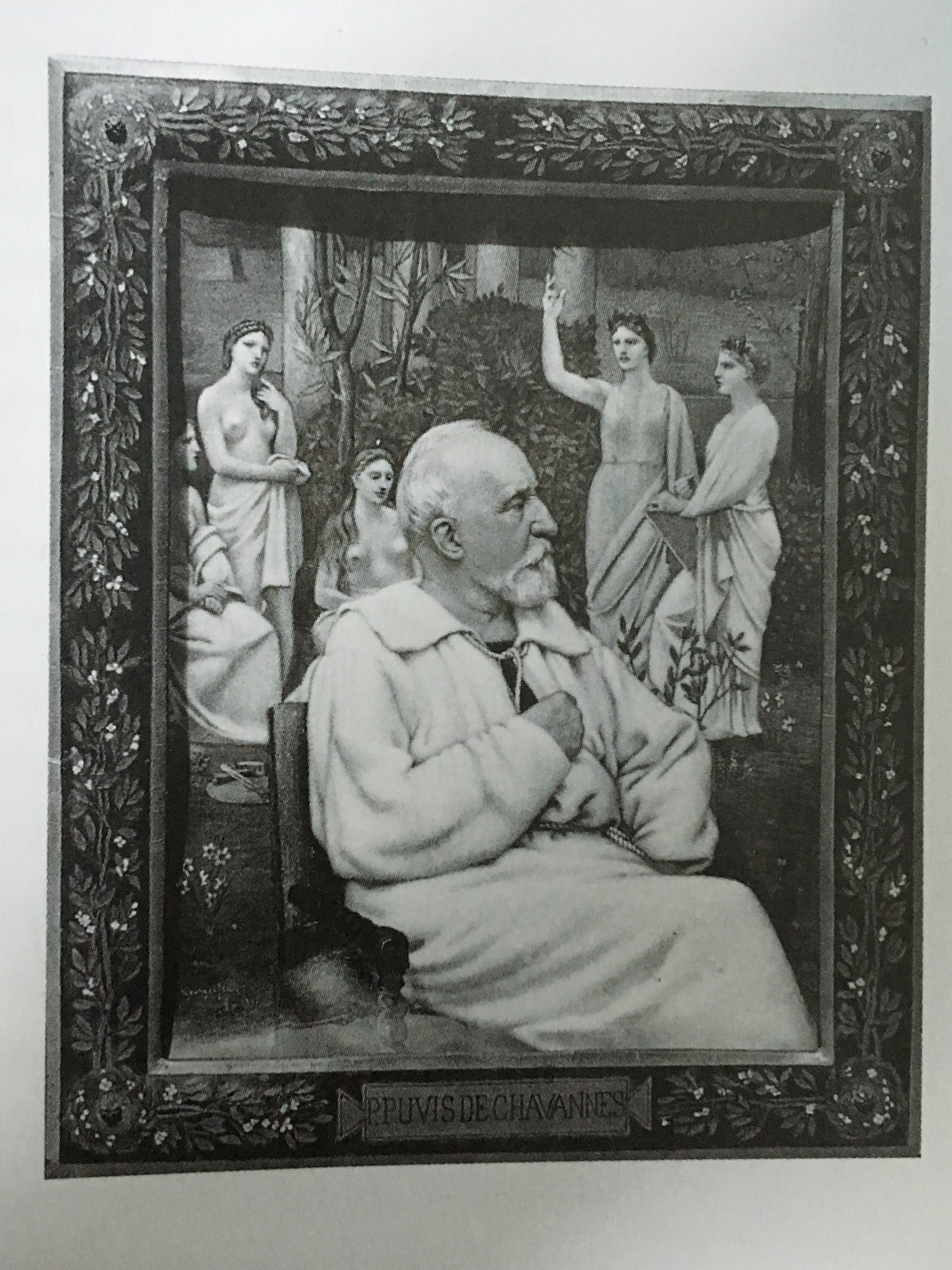
Portrait of Pierre Puvis de Chavannes by Georges Jean

The style of The Sacred Grove, Beloved of the Arts and Muses had influence on post impressionists at the time as well as other artists in the future. Aspects of Pierre Puvis de Chavannes’ style can be found in paintings by Cézanne, Seurat, Gauguin, Matisse and Picasso, whose works used Puvis’ technique of restrained poses and minimal landscape space. Due to Puvis’ prominence at the end of the 19th century, his paintings, especially The Sacred Grove, played a major role in shaping the painting's of the first generation of western style Japanese artists. Puvis framed by the figures and landscape of The Sacred Grove also feature as the subjects of two portraits, one by Marcellin Desboutin and the other by Georges Jean.

== Parody ==
Henri de Toulouse-Lautrec, also a post-impressionist painter, created: The Sacred Grove, Parody of a Painting by Puvis de Chavannes Exhibited at the Salon of 1884 as a parody of the original The Sacred Grove, Beloved of the Arts and Muses. It is also an oil on canvas, however is different in size compared to the original and the showcase piece with dimensions of 172 x 380 cm. Lautrec's piece mimics the subject matter and style of the original, using the fresco technique of applying paint to create a matte surface. Lautrec created the parody after viewing the original showcase piece at the 1884 Paris Salon. It was never intended for public exhibition and was simply poking fun at Puvis. The parody adds additional features to the original, including a clock affixed to the classical portico, a tube of artist's paint held by one of the angels and a parade of men made up of artists wearing periodical Parisian dress. Lautrec included himself in his work as one of the men and is urinating on the ground. The parody further simplifies the original through its use of less detailed figures and undefined landscape. Previously on display at the Princeton University Art Museum in an exhibition titled: “Invoking the Comic Muse: Toulouse-Lautrec’s Parody of ‘The Sacred Grove’”, the painting was given to the Brooklyn Museum in 2026.

A caricature was also created by Albert Robida for La Caricature, a French satirical journal. Critics were complaining that the painting simplified the human body to the point that each figure in The Sacred Grove were merely a copy of the others, a point which this parody emphasised. All of the muses have similar features and are posing in ways that are unnatural and hysteric, marking the original painting as a joke.

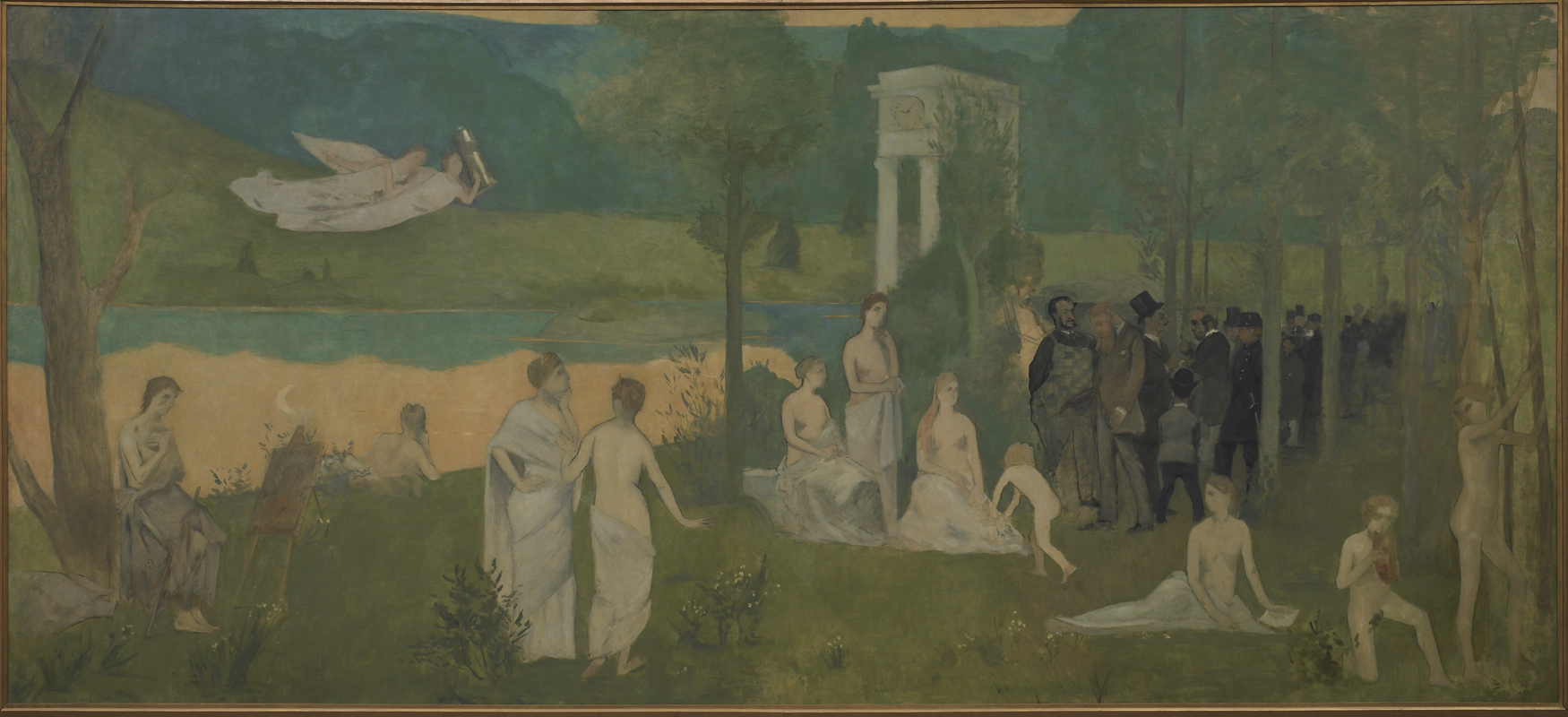
The Sacred Grove, Parody of a Painting by Puvis de Chavannes Exhibited at the Salon of 1884, by Henri de Toulouse-Lautrec

== Exhibition ==
The three different versions of The Sacred Grove have been displayed in various places. The large hemicycle in the Grand Amphitheater of the Sorbonne remains there as does the original painted for the museum in Lyons. The showcase piece however has travelled all over the globe and is one of the main representations of Puvis.

The first exhibition featuring The Sacred Grove was of course at the Salon in 1884 where it won the grand prize. Following the painting’s success there and the creation of the final work for the museum in Lyons, The Sacred Grove as the easel version was not displayed until many years later. It was exhibited after Puvis’ death, in 1975 at the Art Gallery of Ontario in an exhibition titled: “Puvis de Chavannes and the Modern Tradition” alongside its parody by Toulouse Lautrec: The Sacred Grove, Parody of a Painting by Puvis de Chavannes Exhibited at the Salon of 1884, and other paintings by artists whom he influenced, including Vincent Van Gogh, Paul Gauguin and Picasso. A similar exhibition was held in 1994 at the Van Gogh Museum in Amsterdam.

In 2002, The Sacred Grove was housed at the Palazzo Grassi in Venice, in an exhibition which focused on Puvis's influence on modernism and by extension abstract art. The Sacred Grove then returned to France in an exhibition at the Musée de Picardie in Amiens alongside some of Puvis’ other paintings which are permanently displayed there. 2005 saw the works of Lautrec and Puvis brought together again, when The Sacred Grove was exhibited in a show dedicated to Lautrec and their shared home: “Toulouse-Lautrec and Montmartre” at the Art Institute of Chicago, the painting's future home.

Since Puvis had such a profound effect on Western-Japanese artists, The Sacred Grove was included in his first solo exhibition at Bunkamura the Museum, Japan in 2014 titled: “Arcadia by the Shore: The Mythic World of Puvis de Chavannes”. The latest display of The Sacred Grove and other works by Puvis was at the Galerie Michael Werner in Manhattan in early 2019 in the “Pierre Puvis de Chavannes: Works on Paper and Painting” exhibition. This was the first museum retrospective of Puvis’ work in the U.S.A.

The Sacred Grove showcase piece is currently on display at the Art Institute of Chicago in the European Painting and Sculpture Gallery.
