= Pierre Puvis de Chavannes =

French painter (1824–1898)

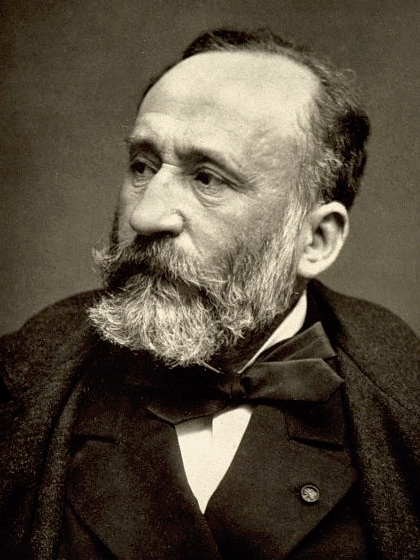
- Pierre-Cécile Puvis de Chavannes, c. 1880, after a negative by Étienne Carjat
- Born: Pierre-Cécile Puvis; 14 December 1824; Lyon, Rhône, France
- Died: 24 October 1898 (aged 73); Paris, France
- Education: Eugène Delacroix, Henri Scheffer, Thomas Couture
- Known for: Painting, drawing
- Notable work: Death and the Maiden, The Dream, The Poor Fisherman
- Movement: Symbolism

Signature
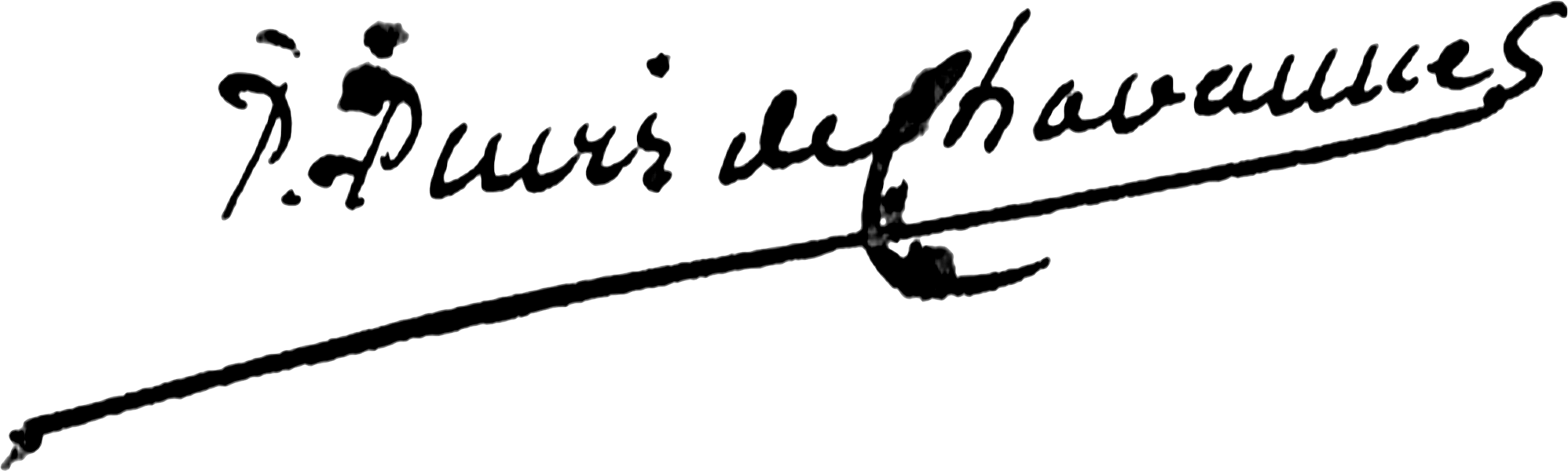

Pierre Puvis de Chavannes (French pronunciation: [pjɛʁ pyvi də ʃavan]; 14 December 1824 – 24 October 1898) was a French painter known for his mural painting, who came to be known as "the painter for France". He became the co-founder and president of the Société Nationale des Beaux-Arts, and his work influenced many other artists, notably Robert Genin, and he aided medallists by designs and suggestions for their works. Puvis de Chavannes was a prominent painter in the early Third Republic. Émile Zola described his work as "an art made of reason, passion, and will".

== Early life ==
Puvis de Chavannes was born Pierre-Cécile Puvis in a suburb of Lyon, France, on December 14, 1824. He was the son of a mining engineer and descended from an old noble family of Burgundy. He later added the ancestral "de Chavannes" to his name. Throughout his life, he spurned his Lyon origins, preferring to identify himself with the 'strong' blood of the Burgundians, where his father originated.

Puvis de Chavannes was educated at the Amiens College and at the Lycée Henri IV in Paris. He intended to follow his father's profession until a serious illness compelled him to convalesce at Mâcon with his brother and sister-in-law in 1844 and 1845, which interrupted his studies. A journey to Italy opened his mind to fresh ideas, and on his return to Paris in 1846, he announced his intention to become a painter.

He studied first under Eugène Delacroix, but only very briefly, as Delacroix closed his studio shortly afterwards due to ill health. He studied subsequently under Henri Scheffer and then Thomas Couture. His training was not classical as he found that he preferred to work alone. He took a large studio near the Gare de Lyon and attended anatomy classes at the Académie des Beaux Arts. It was not until a number of years later, when the government of France acquired one of his works, that he gained wide recognition.

In 1850, Puvis de Chavannes made his Salon debut with Dead Christ, Jeune noir à l'épée (Black youth with a sword), The Reading Lesson, and Portrait of a Man.

== Work ==
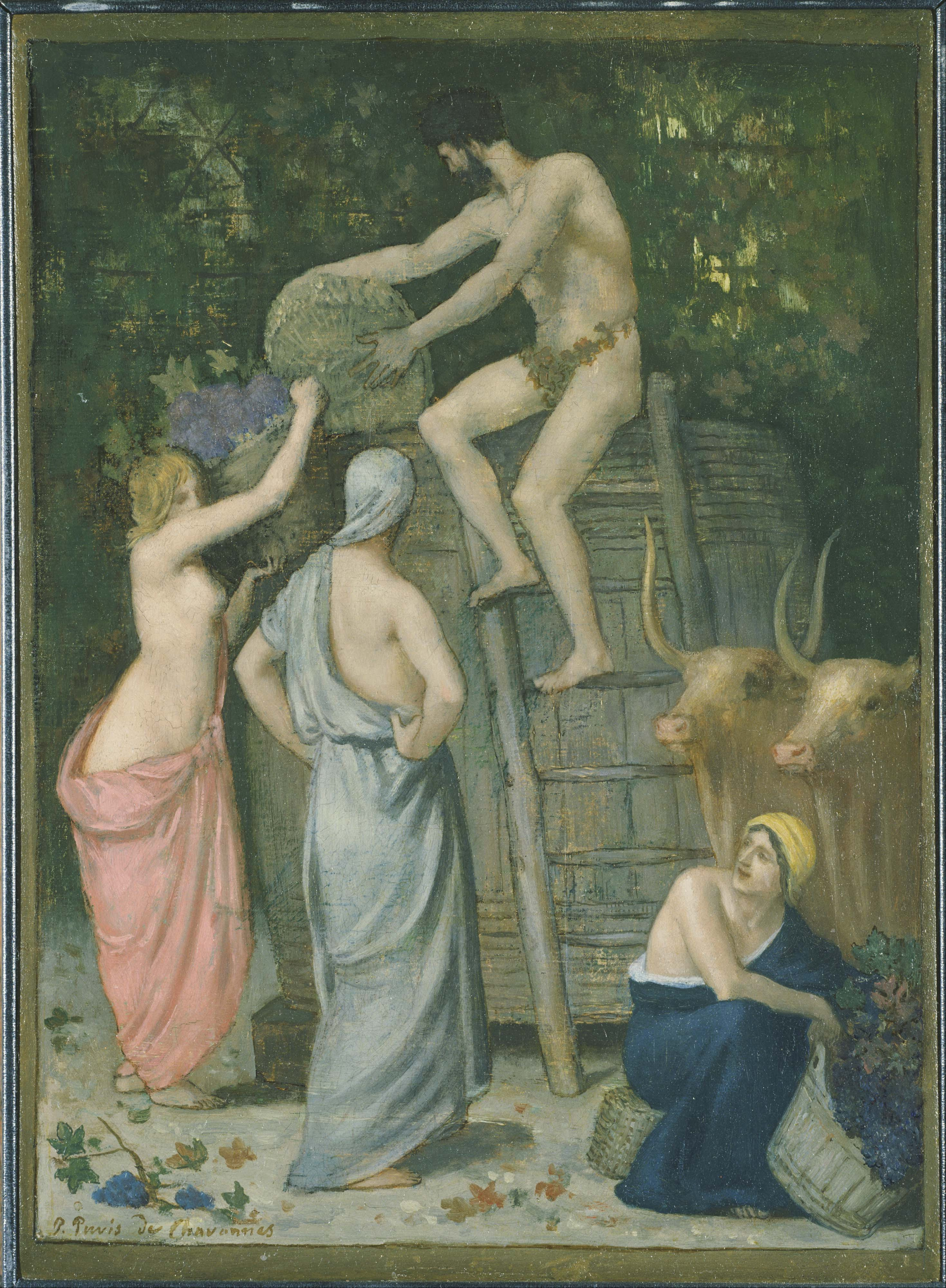
The Wine Press , 1865, The Phillips Collection

Puvis de Chavannes's work is seen as symbolist in nature, even though he studied with some of the romanticists, and he is credited with influencing an entire generation of painters and sculptors, particularly the works of the Modernists. One of his protégés was Georges de Feure.

=== Mural work ===
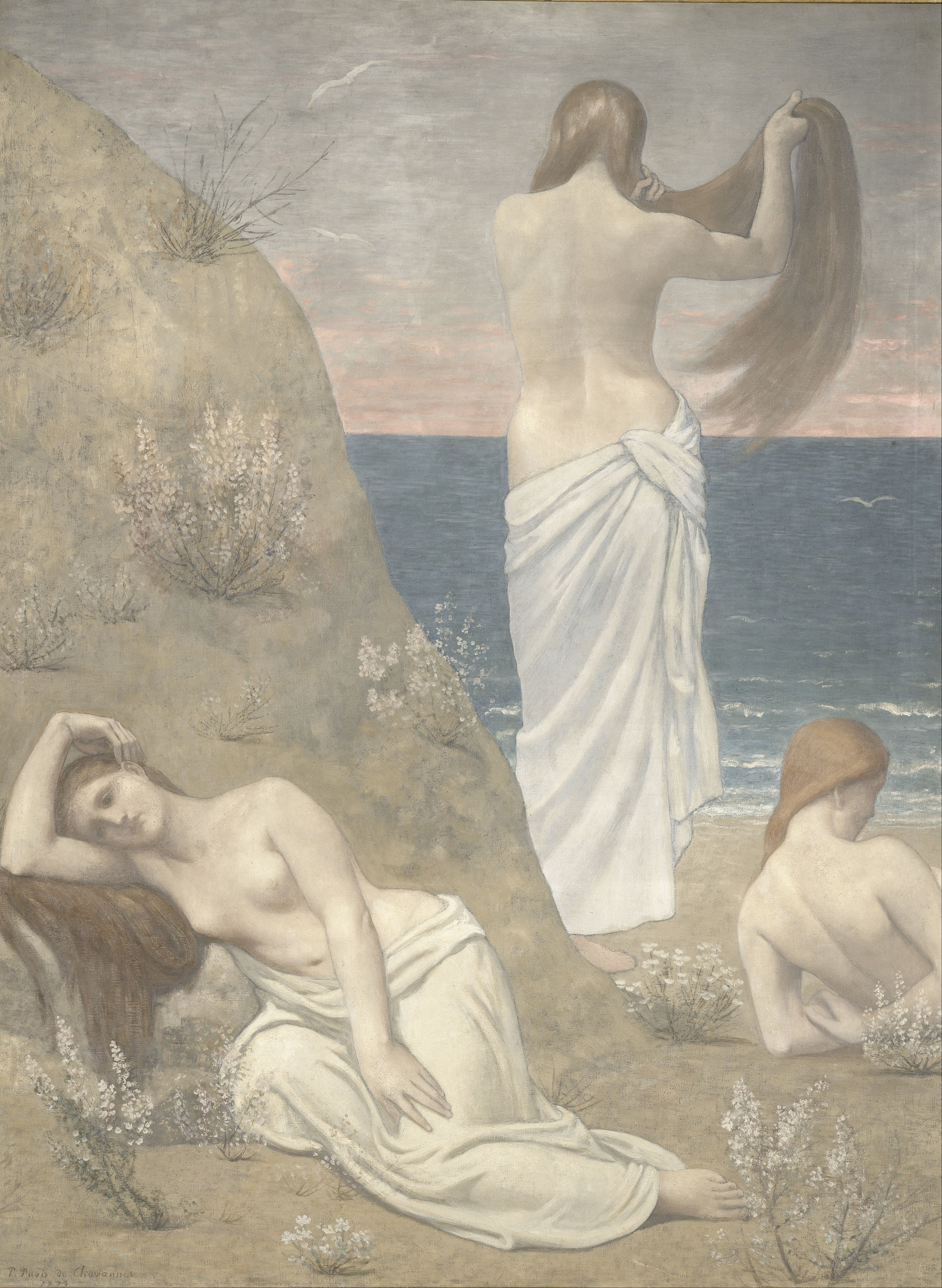
Young Girls by the Seaside (1879)

Puvis de Chavannes is best known for his mural painting, and came to be known as 'the painter for France.' His first commission was for his brother's chateau, Le Brouchy, a medieval-style structure near Cuiseaux in Saône-et-Loire. The principal decorations take the four seasons as their theme. His first public commissions came early in the 1860s, with work at the Musée de Picardie at Amiens. The first four works were Concordia (1861), Bellum (1861), Le Travail (Work; 1863) and Le Repos (Rest; 1863). Between 1883 and 1886 he painted a mural for the Museum of Fine Arts in Lyon.

==== The regions ====
Over the course of his career, Puvis received a substantial number of commissions for works to be carried out in public and private institutions throughout France. His early work at the Musée de Picardie had helped him to develop his classicizing style, and the decorative aesthetic of his mural works.

Among his public works are the later cycles completed at Amiens (Ave Picardia Nutrix, 1865), at Marseille, at Lyon and at Poitiers. Of particular importance is the cycle at the Palais de Beaux Arts in Lyon, which includes three significant works, filling the wall space in the main staircase. From left to right, the works are Antique Vision (1884), The Wood Dear to the Arts and the Muses (1884), and Christian Inspiration (1884).

==== Paris ====
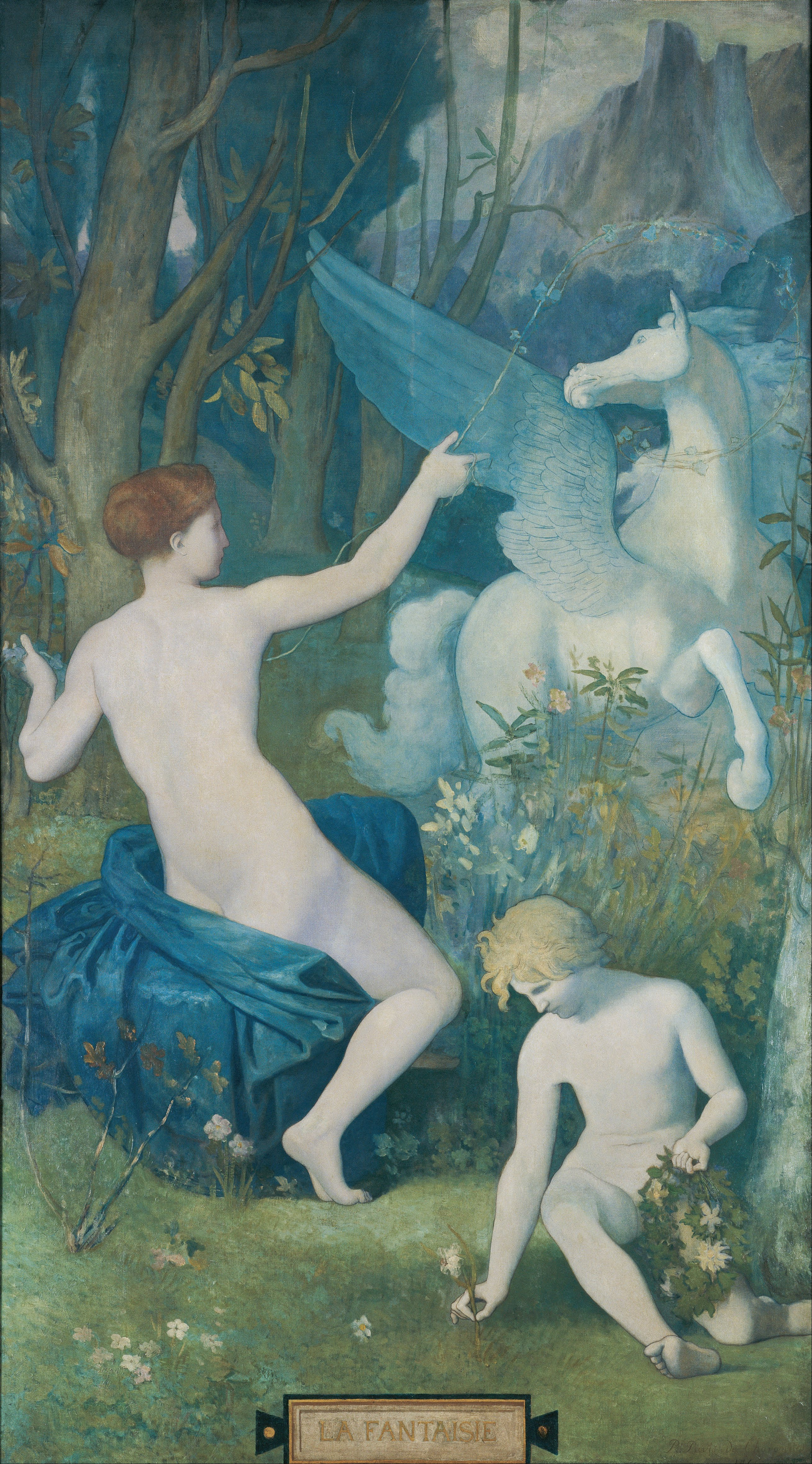
Fantasy (1866), Ohara Museum of Art

Puvis' career was tied up with a complicated debate that had been ongoing since the beginning of the Third Republic (1870), and at the end of the violence of the Paris Commune. The question at stake was the identity of France and the meaning of 'Frenchness'. Royalists felt that the revolution of 1789 had been an immense disaster and that France had been thrown off course, while the Republicans felt that the Revolution had allowed France to revert to its true course. Consequently, works that were to be displayed in public spaces, such as murals, had the important task of fulfilling the ideology of the commissioning party. Many scholars of Puvis's works have noted that his success as a 'painter for France' was largely due to his ability to create works which were agreeable to the many ideologies in existence at this time.

His first Parisian commission was for a cycle at the church of Saint Genevieve, which is now the secular Pantheon, begun in 1874. His two subjects were L'Education de Sainte Geneviève and La Vie Pastoral de Sainte Geneviève. This commission was followed by works at the Sorbonne, namely the enormous hemicycle, The Sacred Grove or L'Ancienne Sorbonne amongst the muses in the Grand Amphitheater of the Sorbonne.

His final commission in this trinity of Republican commissions was the crowning glory of Puvis's career, the works Summer and Winter, at the Hôtel de Ville (City Hall) in Paris.

Many of these works are characterized by their nod to classical art, visible in the careful balanced compositions, and the subject matter is frequently a direct reference to visions of Hellenistic Greece, particularly in the case of Antique Vision.

=== Works on canvas ===
Puvis de Chavannes was president and co-founder in 1890 of the Société Nationale des Beaux-Arts (National Society of Fine Arts) founded in Paris. It became the dominant salon of art at the time and held exhibitions of contemporary art that was selected only by a jury composed of the officers of the Société.

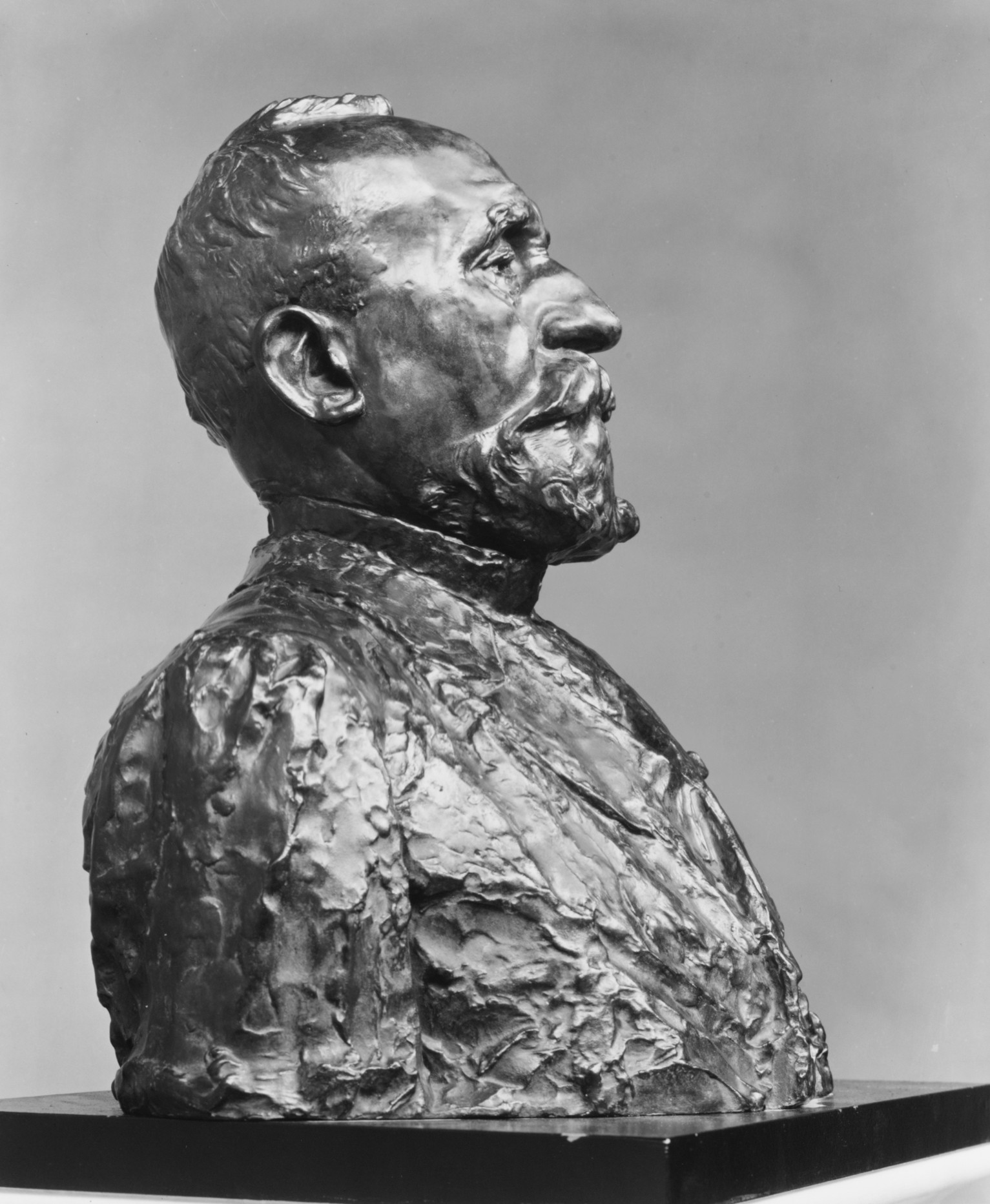
Pierre Puvis de Chavannes by Rodin

Those who translated best the spirit of the work of Puvis de Chavannes in their own creations were, in Germany, the painter Ludwig von Hofmann and in France, Auguste Rodin.

His easel paintings also may be found in many American and European galleries. Some of these paintings are:

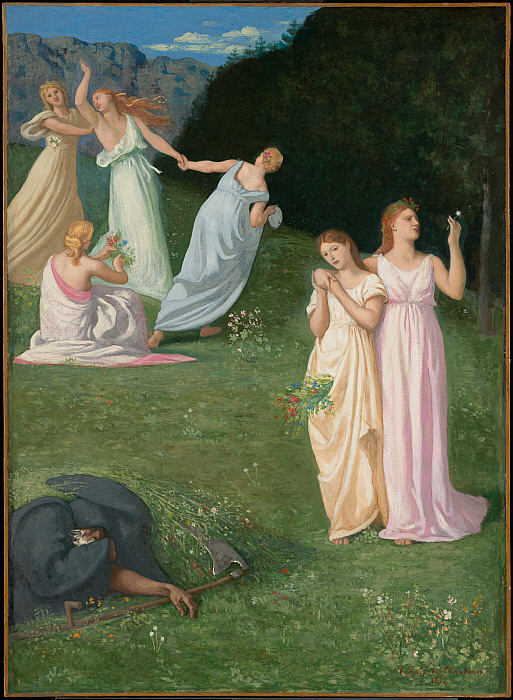
Death and the Maidens, 1872, Clark Art Institute, Williamstown

- Death and the Maiden
- The Dream
- The Poor Fisherman, 1881, oil on canvas
- Vigilance
- The Meditation
- Mary Magdalene at Saint Baume
- Saint Genoveva
- Young Girls at the Seaside, 1879, oil on canvas
- Mad Woman at the Edge of the Sea
- Hope
- Hope (nude)
- Kneeling nude woman, viewed from back
- The Sacred Grove

As far as the appreciation of his life's work is concerned, Puvis de Chavannes was never properly understood by his contemporaries. At the beginning of his career, art criticism was divided into two camps. Adored by the idealists, he was despised by the partisans of the realists. Only with the advent of Symbolism did these two camps unite, but without achieving a convincing appreciation of the painter. Today's research has inherited this contradiction of art criticism and therefore still does not offer a convincing presentation of Puvis de Chavanne's art.

== Personal life ==
In Montmartre, he had an affair with one of his models, Suzanne Valadon, who would become one of the leading artists of the day as well as the mother, teacher, and mentor of Maurice Utrillo. From 1856, he was in a relationship with the Romanian princess, Marie Cantacuzène. The couple were together for 40 years, and were married before their deaths in 1898.

== Puvis de Chavannes Prize ==
Beginning in 1926, The Prix Puvis de Chavannes (Puvis de Chavannes prize) was awarded by the National Society of Fine Arts (Société Nationale des Beaux-Arts). The Prix Puvis de Chavannes is the retrospective exhibition in Paris of the main works of the artist awarded the prize that year. During the twentieth century, this exhibition was located at the Grand Palais or the Musée d'Art Moderne. Recipients of the prize include:

- 1941: Wilhem Van Hasselt
- 1944: Jean Gabriel Domergue
- 1948: Joseph Pinchon
- 1952: Tristan Klingsor
- 1955: Georges Delplanque
- 1957: Albert Decaris
- 1958: Jean Picard Le Doux
- 1963: Maurice Boitel,
- 1966: Pierre Gaillardot
- 1968: Pierre-Henry
- 1969: Louis Vuillermoz
- 1970: Daniel du Janerand
- 1971: Jean-Pierre Alaux
- 1975: Jean Monneret
- 1987: André Hambourg
- 1991: Gaston Sébire
- 1993: Jean Cluseau-Lanauve
- 2006: Paul Collomb

== Gallery ==
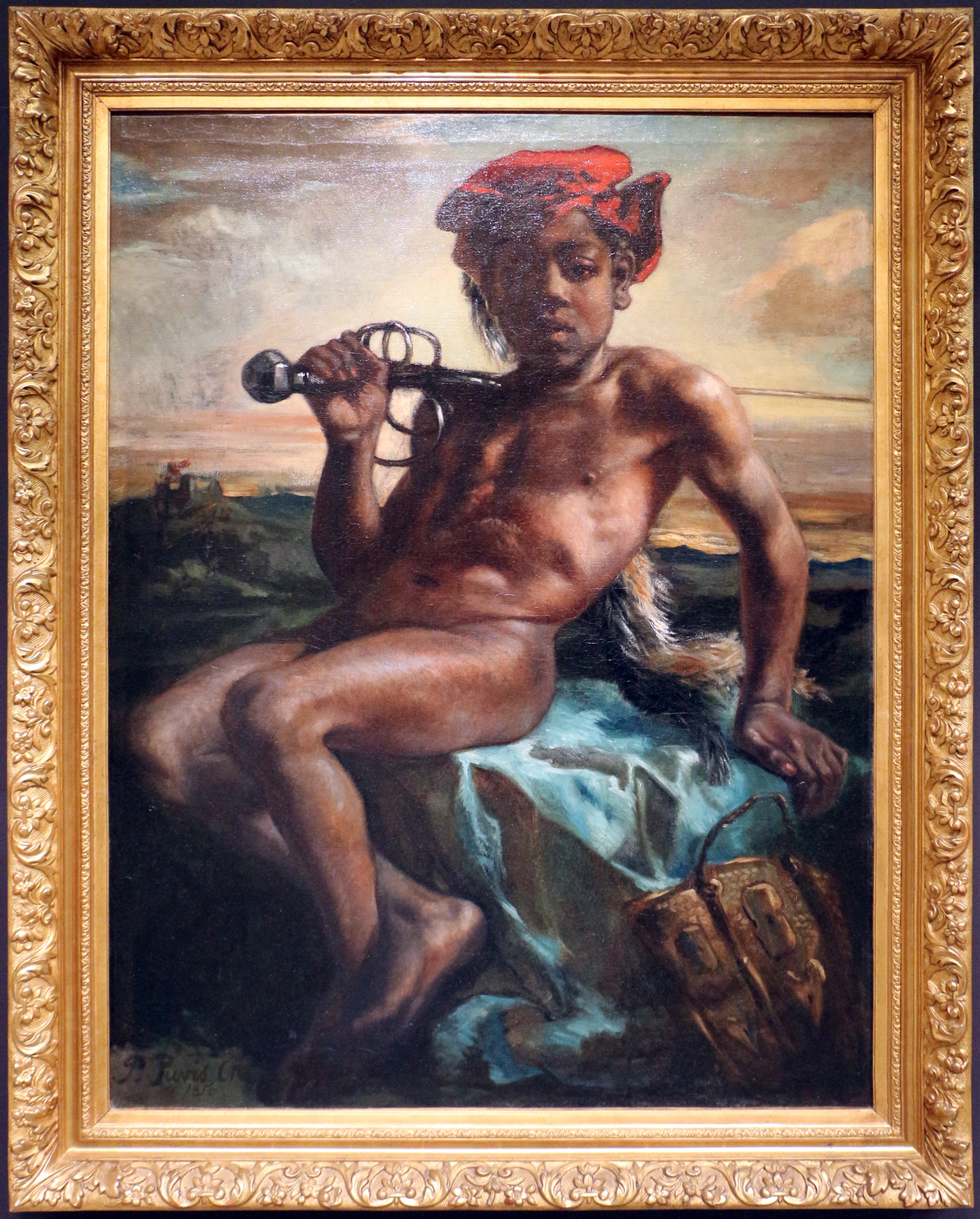
Jeune noir à l'épée (Black lad with a sword) (1850), Musée d'Orsay

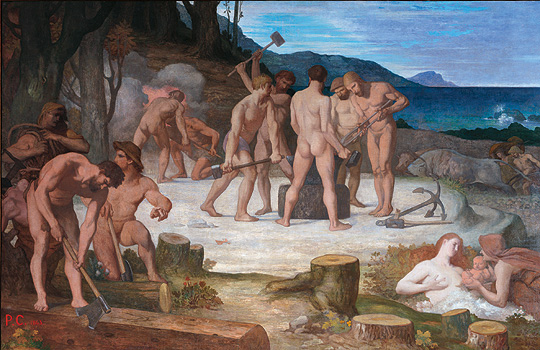
Le Travail (1863), Musée de Picardie

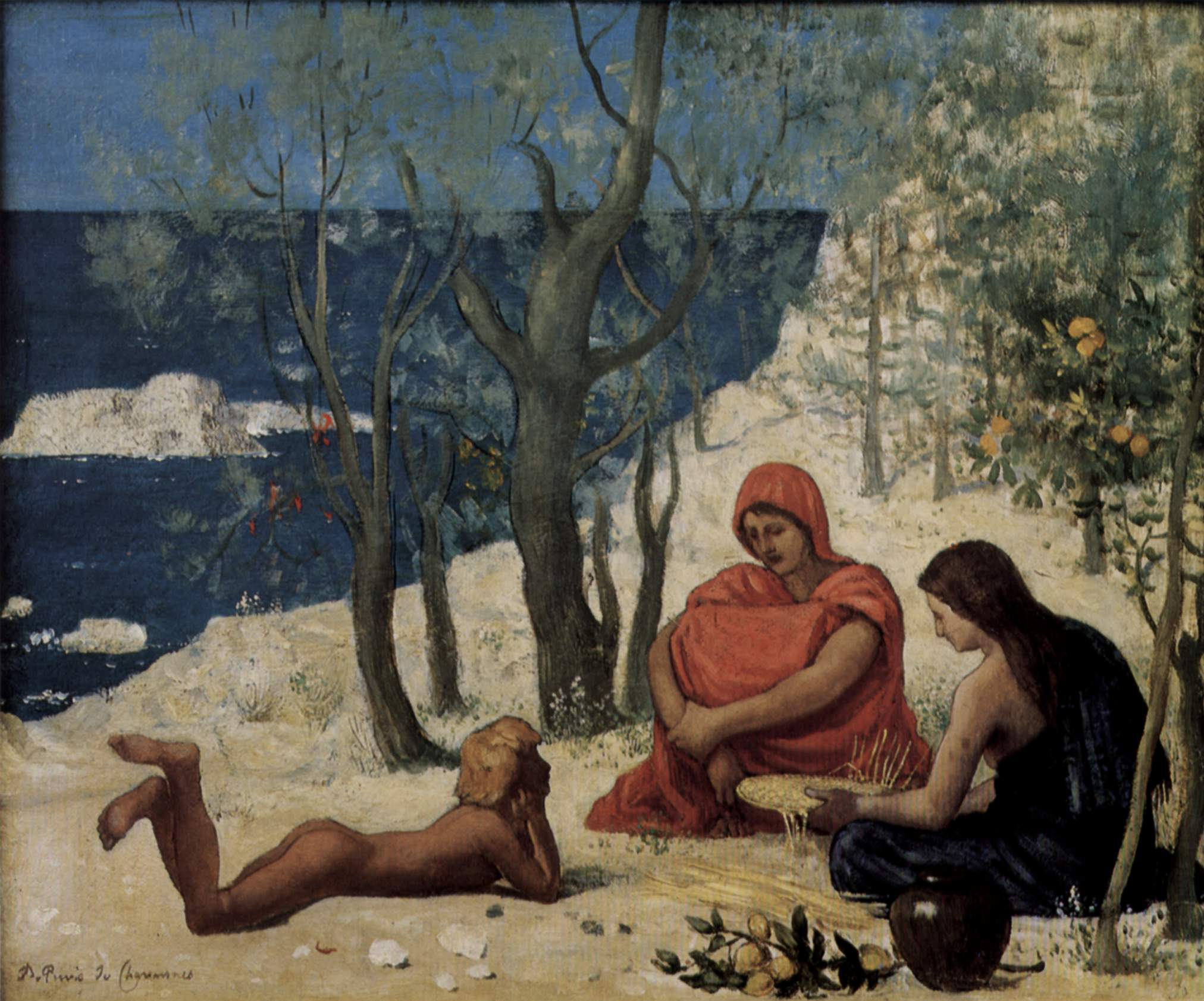
The White Rocks (1869–1872)

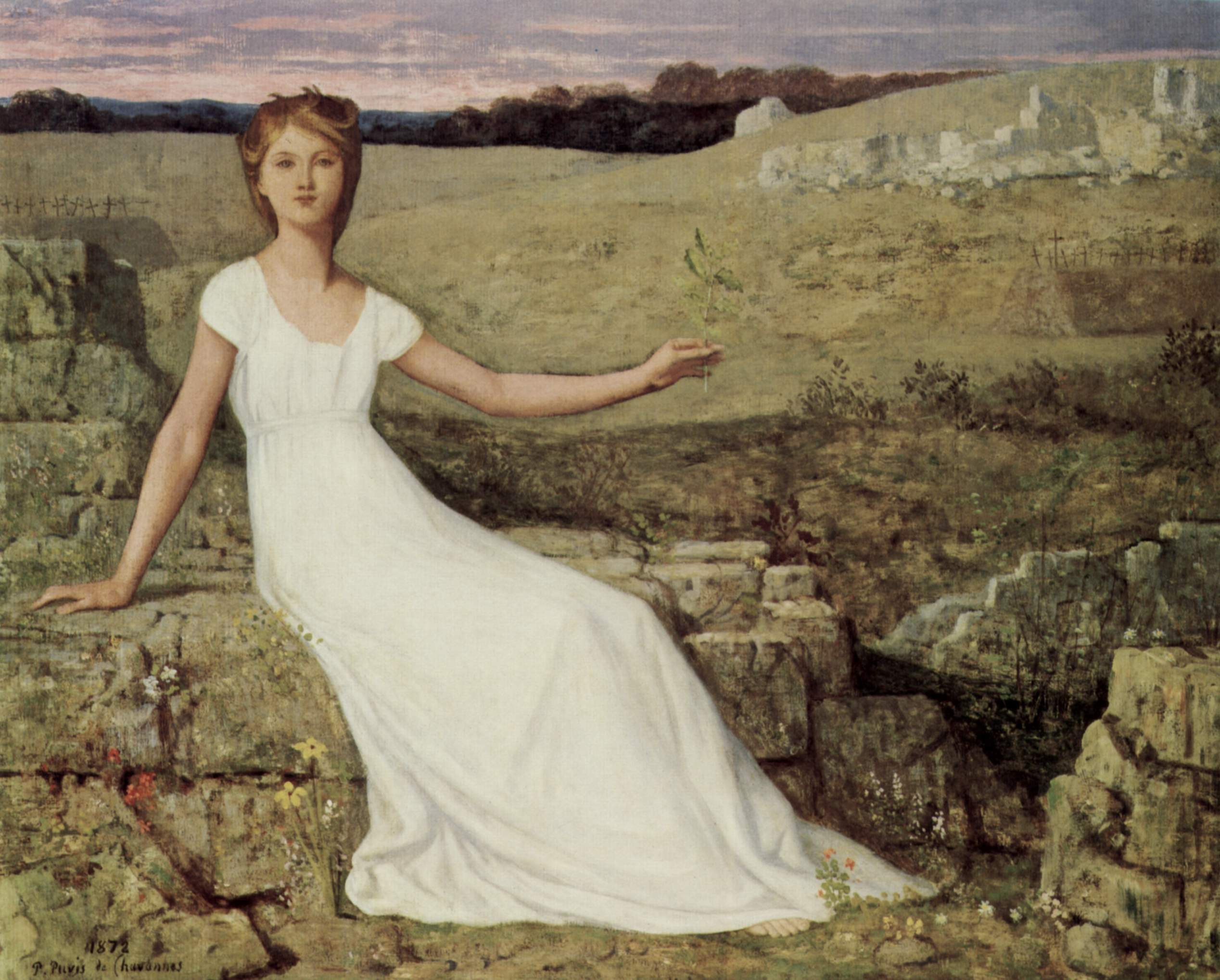
Hope (1872), Walters Art Museum

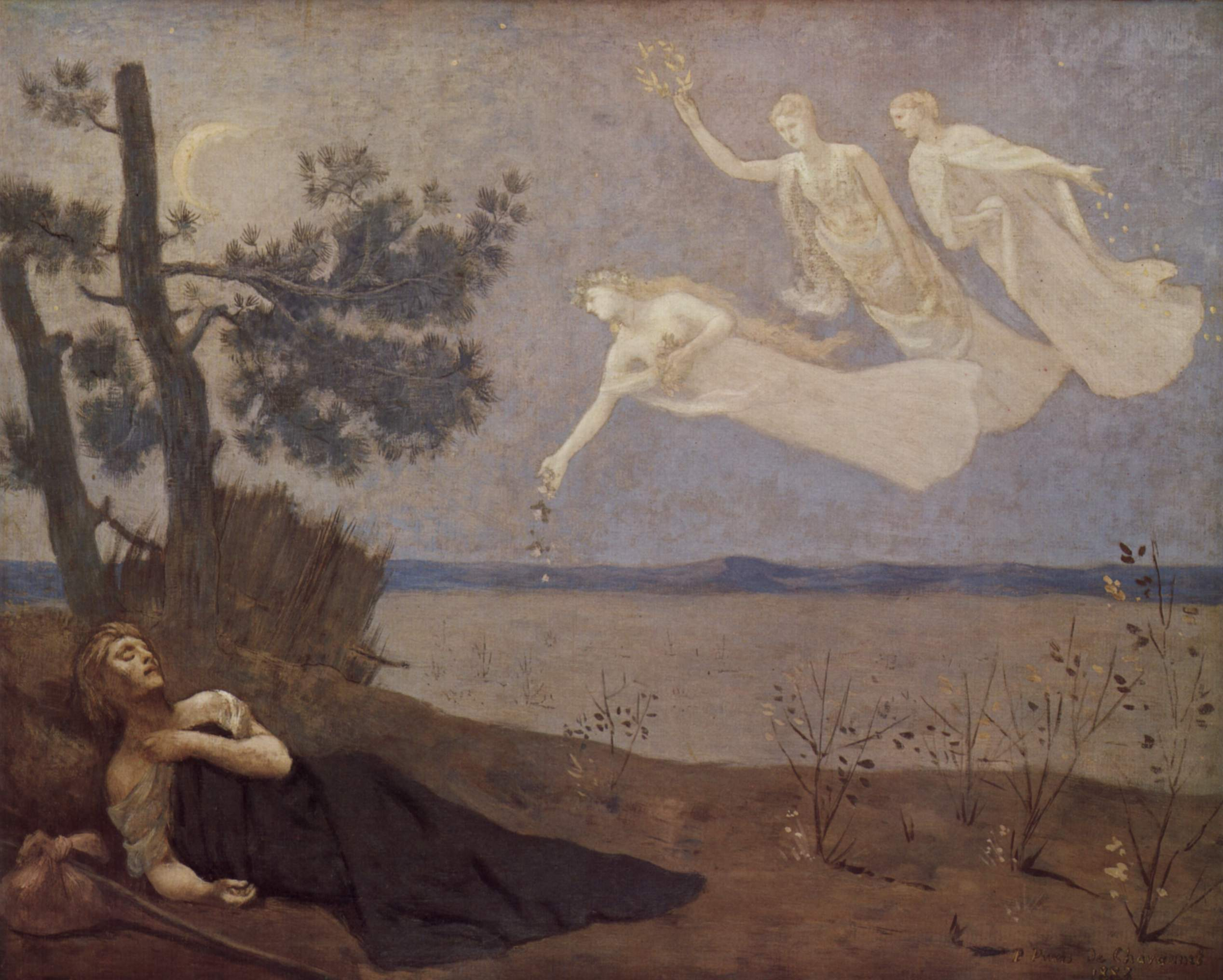
The Dream (1883), Walters Art Museum

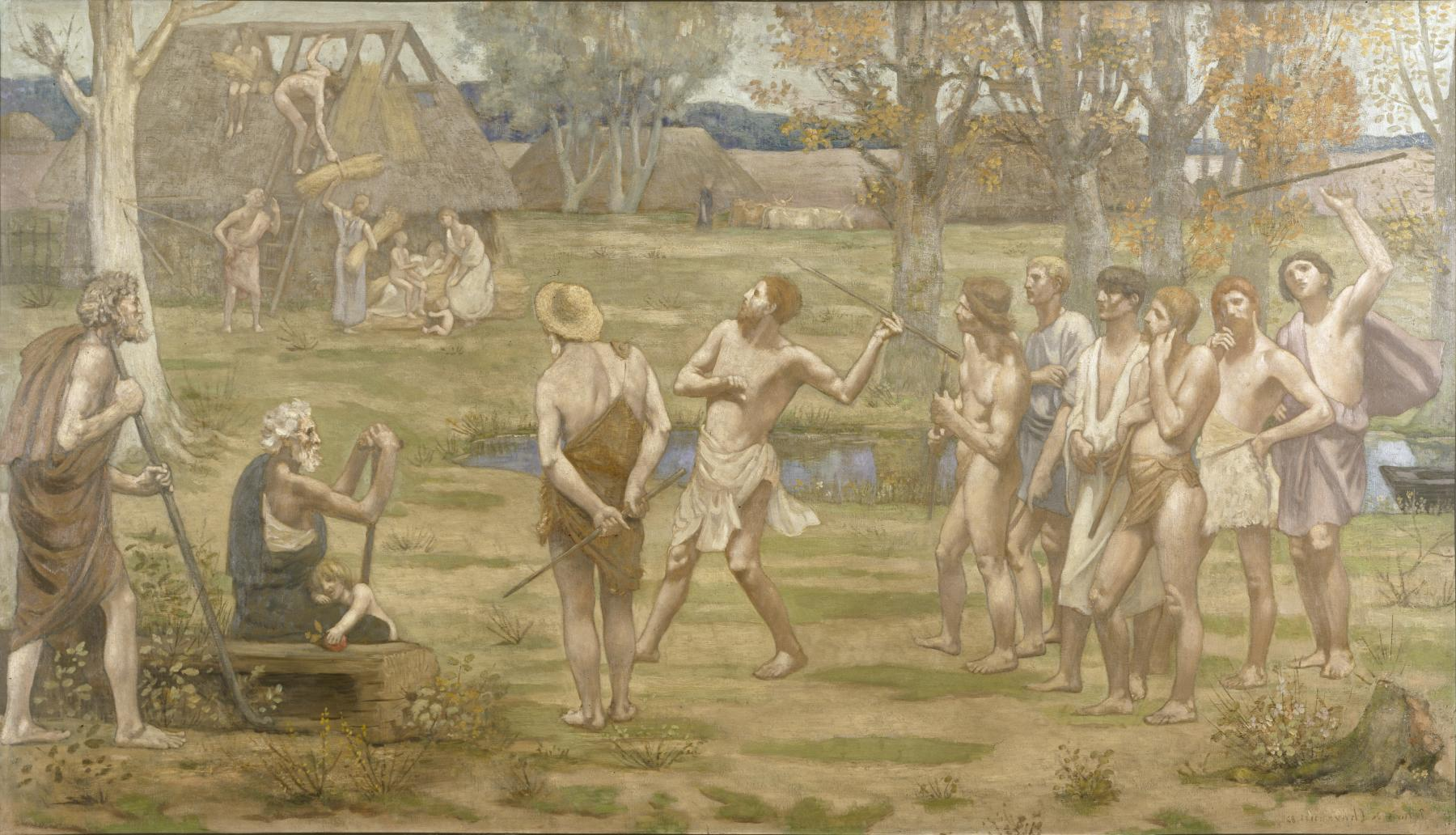
Ludus Pro Patria (1883), Walters Art Museum

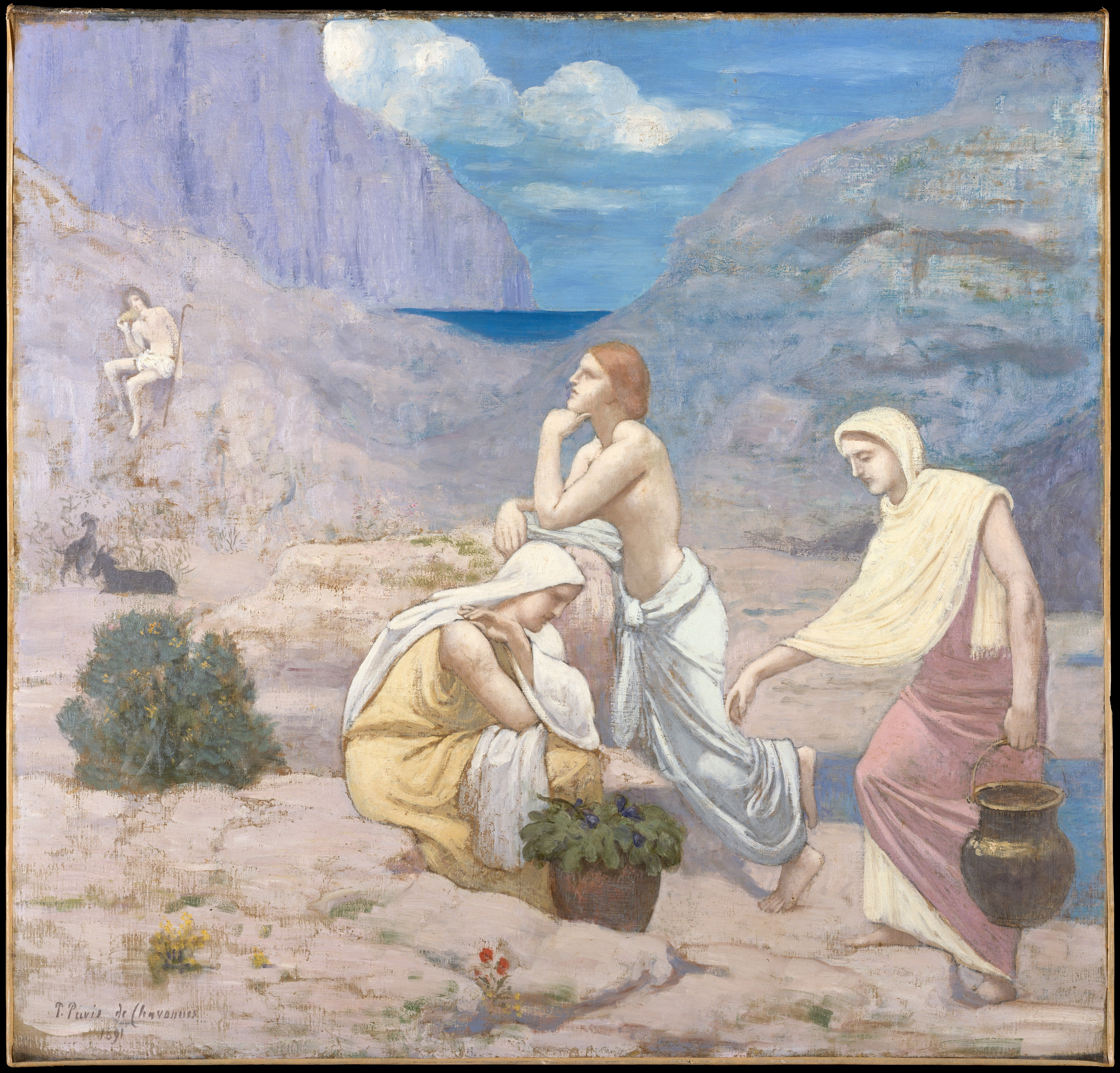
The Shepherd's Song (1891)

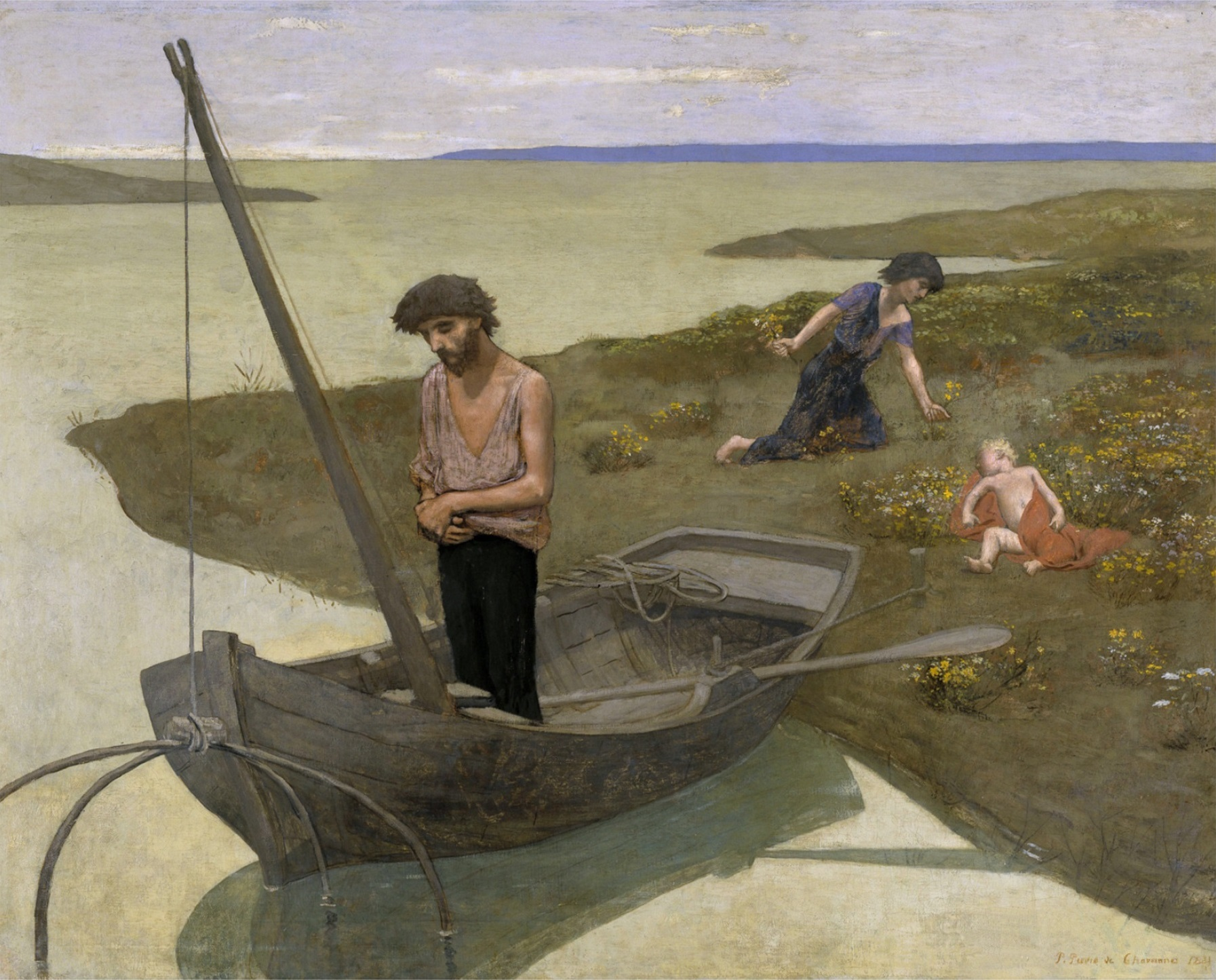
The Poor Fisherman (1881), Musée d'Orsay

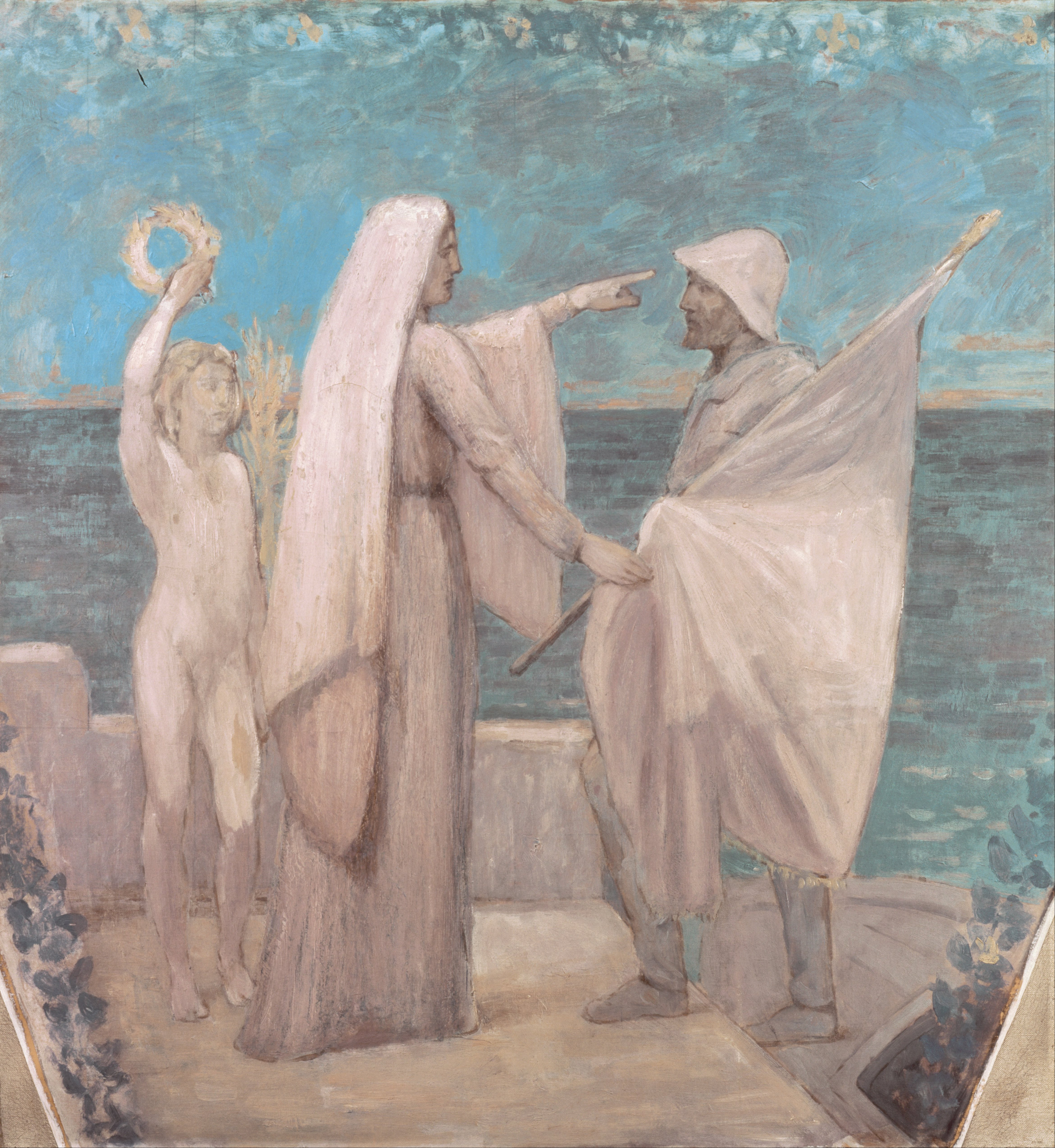
Study for Patriotism (ca. 1893)

== See also ==
- Symbolism (arts)
- Boston Central Library
- List of European art awards
- Les Maîtres de l'Affiche
